

420001–420100 

|-bgcolor=#E9E9E9
| 420001 ||  || — || January 30, 2011 || Mount Lemmon || Mount Lemmon Survey || — || align=right | 1.5 km || 
|-id=002 bgcolor=#E9E9E9
| 420002 ||  || — || March 31, 2007 || Catalina || NEAT || — || align=right | 2.0 km || 
|-id=003 bgcolor=#E9E9E9
| 420003 ||  || — || September 14, 2009 || Catalina || CSS || — || align=right | 2.5 km || 
|-id=004 bgcolor=#E9E9E9
| 420004 ||  || — || December 1, 2005 || Kitt Peak || Spacewatch || PAD || align=right | 1.4 km || 
|-id=005 bgcolor=#E9E9E9
| 420005 ||  || — || September 16, 2009 || Kitt Peak || Spacewatch || — || align=right | 1.9 km || 
|-id=006 bgcolor=#d6d6d6
| 420006 ||  || — || December 19, 2004 || Kitt Peak || Spacewatch || — || align=right | 3.9 km || 
|-id=007 bgcolor=#d6d6d6
| 420007 ||  || — || January 28, 2011 || Mount Lemmon || Mount Lemmon Survey || — || align=right | 2.5 km || 
|-id=008 bgcolor=#E9E9E9
| 420008 ||  || — || September 6, 2008 || Mount Lemmon || Mount Lemmon Survey || — || align=right | 1.8 km || 
|-id=009 bgcolor=#E9E9E9
| 420009 ||  || — || August 23, 2004 || Kitt Peak || Spacewatch || — || align=right | 1.9 km || 
|-id=010 bgcolor=#E9E9E9
| 420010 ||  || — || January 26, 2011 || Dauban || Mount Lemmon Survey || — || align=right | 1.7 km || 
|-id=011 bgcolor=#E9E9E9
| 420011 ||  || — || January 17, 2007 || Socorro || NEAT || — || align=right | 1.1 km || 
|-id=012 bgcolor=#E9E9E9
| 420012 ||  || — || March 11, 2007 || Kitt Peak || Spacewatch || WIT || align=right data-sort-value="0.98" | 980 m || 
|-id=013 bgcolor=#E9E9E9
| 420013 ||  || — || November 11, 2010 || Kitt Peak || Spacewatch || — || align=right | 1.1 km || 
|-id=014 bgcolor=#E9E9E9
| 420014 ||  || — || April 29, 2003 || La Sagra || NEAT || — || align=right | 1.3 km || 
|-id=015 bgcolor=#E9E9E9
| 420015 ||  || — || November 16, 2010 || Mount Lemmon || Mount Lemmon Survey || MRX || align=right | 1.3 km || 
|-id=016 bgcolor=#E9E9E9
| 420016 ||  || — || April 7, 2003 || Kitt Peak || Spacewatch || (5) || align=right data-sort-value="0.84" | 840 m || 
|-id=017 bgcolor=#d6d6d6
| 420017 ||  || — || April 10, 2000 || Anderson Mesa || LONEOS || — || align=right | 4.0 km || 
|-id=018 bgcolor=#E9E9E9
| 420018 ||  || — || November 26, 2005 || Catalina || CSS || JUN || align=right | 1.4 km || 
|-id=019 bgcolor=#d6d6d6
| 420019 ||  || — || October 17, 2003 || Kitt Peak || Spacewatch || — || align=right | 2.7 km || 
|-id=020 bgcolor=#d6d6d6
| 420020 ||  || — || February 4, 2010 || WISE || WISE || — || align=right | 3.0 km || 
|-id=021 bgcolor=#d6d6d6
| 420021 ||  || — || September 22, 2003 || Haleakala || Spacewatch || — || align=right | 3.1 km || 
|-id=022 bgcolor=#E9E9E9
| 420022 ||  || — || December 29, 2005 || Mount Lemmon || Mount Lemmon Survey || NEM || align=right | 2.4 km || 
|-id=023 bgcolor=#E9E9E9
| 420023 ||  || — || November 19, 2009 || Kitt Peak || Spacewatch || — || align=right | 2.4 km || 
|-id=024 bgcolor=#d6d6d6
| 420024 ||  || — || November 20, 2003 || Kitt Peak || Spacewatch || VER || align=right | 2.4 km || 
|-id=025 bgcolor=#d6d6d6
| 420025 ||  || — || September 21, 2009 || Mount Lemmon || Mount Lemmon Survey || — || align=right | 2.2 km || 
|-id=026 bgcolor=#d6d6d6
| 420026 ||  || — || July 25, 2003 || Palomar || NEAT || — || align=right | 2.7 km || 
|-id=027 bgcolor=#d6d6d6
| 420027 ||  || — || September 21, 2009 || Mount Lemmon || Mount Lemmon Survey || KOR || align=right | 1.1 km || 
|-id=028 bgcolor=#E9E9E9
| 420028 ||  || — || December 28, 2005 || Mount Lemmon || Mount Lemmon Survey || — || align=right | 2.4 km || 
|-id=029 bgcolor=#d6d6d6
| 420029 ||  || — || October 26, 2009 || Kitt Peak || Spacewatch || — || align=right | 2.1 km || 
|-id=030 bgcolor=#d6d6d6
| 420030 ||  || — || December 14, 2004 || Socorro || LINEAR || — || align=right | 3.2 km || 
|-id=031 bgcolor=#E9E9E9
| 420031 ||  || — || September 6, 2008 || Mount Lemmon || Mount Lemmon Survey || — || align=right | 1.3 km || 
|-id=032 bgcolor=#E9E9E9
| 420032 ||  || — || September 21, 2009 || Mount Lemmon || Mount Lemmon Survey || JUN || align=right | 1.1 km || 
|-id=033 bgcolor=#d6d6d6
| 420033 ||  || — || December 10, 2010 || Mount Lemmon || Mount Lemmon Survey || — || align=right | 3.5 km || 
|-id=034 bgcolor=#d6d6d6
| 420034 ||  || — || January 31, 2006 || Mount Lemmon || Mount Lemmon Survey || — || align=right | 2.6 km || 
|-id=035 bgcolor=#d6d6d6
| 420035 ||  || — || September 3, 2008 || Kitt Peak || Spacewatch || — || align=right | 3.3 km || 
|-id=036 bgcolor=#d6d6d6
| 420036 ||  || — || February 9, 2011 || Mount Lemmon || Mount Lemmon Survey || EOS || align=right | 1.5 km || 
|-id=037 bgcolor=#E9E9E9
| 420037 ||  || — || January 28, 2006 || Mount Lemmon || Mount Lemmon Survey || — || align=right | 3.7 km || 
|-id=038 bgcolor=#d6d6d6
| 420038 ||  || — || March 3, 2000 || Socorro || LINEAR || — || align=right | 3.2 km || 
|-id=039 bgcolor=#E9E9E9
| 420039 ||  || — || October 8, 2008 || Mount Lemmon || Mount Lemmon Survey || — || align=right | 3.3 km || 
|-id=040 bgcolor=#E9E9E9
| 420040 ||  || — || March 21, 2002 || Kitt Peak || Spacewatch || — || align=right | 2.4 km || 
|-id=041 bgcolor=#E9E9E9
| 420041 ||  || — || April 8, 2002 || Palomar || NEAT || — || align=right | 2.8 km || 
|-id=042 bgcolor=#E9E9E9
| 420042 ||  || — || September 29, 2009 || Mount Lemmon || Mount Lemmon Survey || — || align=right | 1.8 km || 
|-id=043 bgcolor=#E9E9E9
| 420043 ||  || — || November 6, 2005 || Mount Lemmon || Mount Lemmon Survey || — || align=right | 1.3 km || 
|-id=044 bgcolor=#d6d6d6
| 420044 ||  || — || February 25, 2006 || Kitt Peak || Spacewatch || — || align=right | 2.8 km || 
|-id=045 bgcolor=#d6d6d6
| 420045 ||  || — || January 30, 2006 || Kitt Peak || Spacewatch || — || align=right | 2.5 km || 
|-id=046 bgcolor=#E9E9E9
| 420046 ||  || — || March 14, 2007 || Kitt Peak || Spacewatch || — || align=right | 1.5 km || 
|-id=047 bgcolor=#d6d6d6
| 420047 ||  || — || September 22, 2003 || Palomar || NEAT || — || align=right | 3.0 km || 
|-id=048 bgcolor=#FFC2E0
| 420048 ||  || — || December 6, 2010 || Mount Lemmon || Mount Lemmon Survey || APO || align=right data-sort-value="0.60" | 600 m || 
|-id=049 bgcolor=#E9E9E9
| 420049 ||  || — || May 28, 2008 || Mount Lemmon || Mount Lemmon Survey || — || align=right | 1.2 km || 
|-id=050 bgcolor=#E9E9E9
| 420050 ||  || — || December 30, 2005 || Kitt Peak || Spacewatch || AGN || align=right data-sort-value="0.95" | 950 m || 
|-id=051 bgcolor=#d6d6d6
| 420051 ||  || — || February 26, 2011 || Kitt Peak || Spacewatch || — || align=right | 3.1 km || 
|-id=052 bgcolor=#E9E9E9
| 420052 ||  || — || October 25, 2009 || Kitt Peak || Spacewatch || MRX || align=right | 1.0 km || 
|-id=053 bgcolor=#d6d6d6
| 420053 ||  || — || September 5, 2008 || Kitt Peak || Spacewatch || — || align=right | 3.2 km || 
|-id=054 bgcolor=#E9E9E9
| 420054 ||  || — || December 22, 2001 || Socorro || LINEAR || — || align=right | 1.7 km || 
|-id=055 bgcolor=#d6d6d6
| 420055 ||  || — || September 19, 2003 || Kitt Peak || Spacewatch || — || align=right | 3.0 km || 
|-id=056 bgcolor=#d6d6d6
| 420056 ||  || — || March 3, 2006 || Kitt Peak || Spacewatch || KOR || align=right | 1.3 km || 
|-id=057 bgcolor=#d6d6d6
| 420057 ||  || — || September 5, 2008 || Kitt Peak || Spacewatch || EOS || align=right | 2.0 km || 
|-id=058 bgcolor=#d6d6d6
| 420058 ||  || — || March 1, 2010 || WISE || WISE || — || align=right | 3.9 km || 
|-id=059 bgcolor=#d6d6d6
| 420059 ||  || — || February 2, 2006 || Mount Lemmon || Mount Lemmon Survey || — || align=right | 3.0 km || 
|-id=060 bgcolor=#E9E9E9
| 420060 ||  || — || November 18, 2001 || Socorro || LINEAR || — || align=right | 1.6 km || 
|-id=061 bgcolor=#E9E9E9
| 420061 ||  || — || September 30, 2009 || Mount Lemmon || Mount Lemmon Survey || — || align=right | 1.9 km || 
|-id=062 bgcolor=#E9E9E9
| 420062 ||  || — || February 26, 2007 || Mount Lemmon || Mount Lemmon Survey || critical || align=right data-sort-value="0.65" | 650 m || 
|-id=063 bgcolor=#E9E9E9
| 420063 ||  || — || February 23, 1998 || Kitt Peak || Spacewatch || — || align=right | 1.4 km || 
|-id=064 bgcolor=#E9E9E9
| 420064 ||  || — || April 13, 2002 || Bergisch Gladbach || NEAT || — || align=right | 2.6 km || 
|-id=065 bgcolor=#E9E9E9
| 420065 ||  || — || January 30, 2011 || Kitt Peak || Spacewatch || — || align=right | 2.6 km || 
|-id=066 bgcolor=#E9E9E9
| 420066 ||  || — || November 30, 2005 || Kitt Peak || Spacewatch || — || align=right | 1.5 km || 
|-id=067 bgcolor=#E9E9E9
| 420067 ||  || — || September 19, 2001 || Socorro || LINEAR || — || align=right data-sort-value="0.89" | 890 m || 
|-id=068 bgcolor=#d6d6d6
| 420068 ||  || — || February 5, 2010 || WISE || WISE || — || align=right | 2.4 km || 
|-id=069 bgcolor=#d6d6d6
| 420069 ||  || — || January 31, 2006 || Kitt Peak || Spacewatch || KOR || align=right | 1.4 km || 
|-id=070 bgcolor=#d6d6d6
| 420070 ||  || — || April 8, 2006 || Kitt Peak || Spacewatch || — || align=right | 3.6 km || 
|-id=071 bgcolor=#d6d6d6
| 420071 ||  || — || March 4, 2011 || Kitt Peak || Spacewatch || EOS || align=right | 1.6 km || 
|-id=072 bgcolor=#d6d6d6
| 420072 ||  || — || March 6, 2011 || Mount Lemmon || Mount Lemmon Survey || — || align=right | 3.3 km || 
|-id=073 bgcolor=#d6d6d6
| 420073 ||  || — || February 23, 2011 || Kitt Peak || Spacewatch || — || align=right | 3.2 km || 
|-id=074 bgcolor=#E9E9E9
| 420074 ||  || — || December 10, 2005 || Kitt Peak || Spacewatch || — || align=right | 2.2 km || 
|-id=075 bgcolor=#d6d6d6
| 420075 ||  || — || November 23, 2009 || Mount Lemmon || Mount Lemmon Survey || EMA || align=right | 4.3 km || 
|-id=076 bgcolor=#E9E9E9
| 420076 ||  || — || July 26, 2008 || Siding Spring || SSS || — || align=right | 2.9 km || 
|-id=077 bgcolor=#E9E9E9
| 420077 ||  || — || December 27, 2005 || Kitt Peak || Spacewatch || MRX || align=right data-sort-value="0.80" | 800 m || 
|-id=078 bgcolor=#E9E9E9
| 420078 ||  || — || January 5, 2006 || Catalina || CSS || — || align=right | 2.2 km || 
|-id=079 bgcolor=#d6d6d6
| 420079 ||  || — || February 25, 2011 || Kitt Peak || Spacewatch || — || align=right | 2.7 km || 
|-id=080 bgcolor=#d6d6d6
| 420080 ||  || — || March 2, 2011 || Kitt Peak || Spacewatch || — || align=right | 3.3 km || 
|-id=081 bgcolor=#d6d6d6
| 420081 ||  || — || September 2, 2008 || Kitt Peak || Spacewatch || — || align=right | 3.0 km || 
|-id=082 bgcolor=#d6d6d6
| 420082 ||  || — || January 17, 2011 || Mount Lemmon || Mount Lemmon Survey || — || align=right | 3.1 km || 
|-id=083 bgcolor=#d6d6d6
| 420083 ||  || — || October 6, 2008 || Mount Lemmon || Mount Lemmon Survey || — || align=right | 3.1 km || 
|-id=084 bgcolor=#d6d6d6
| 420084 ||  || — || February 19, 2010 || WISE || WISE || — || align=right | 3.3 km || 
|-id=085 bgcolor=#E9E9E9
| 420085 ||  || — || October 18, 2009 || Catalina || CSS || — || align=right | 2.7 km || 
|-id=086 bgcolor=#d6d6d6
| 420086 ||  || — || April 20, 2006 || Siegen || Spacewatch || — || align=right | 3.4 km || 
|-id=087 bgcolor=#E9E9E9
| 420087 ||  || — || October 14, 2009 || Mount Lemmon || Mount Lemmon Survey || — || align=right | 1.3 km || 
|-id=088 bgcolor=#E9E9E9
| 420088 ||  || — || February 2, 2006 || Kitt Peak || Spacewatch || — || align=right | 2.8 km || 
|-id=089 bgcolor=#d6d6d6
| 420089 ||  || — || September 24, 2008 || Kitt Peak || Spacewatch || — || align=right | 3.0 km || 
|-id=090 bgcolor=#d6d6d6
| 420090 ||  || — || October 20, 2003 || Kitt Peak || Spacewatch || — || align=right | 2.9 km || 
|-id=091 bgcolor=#d6d6d6
| 420091 ||  || — || October 9, 2004 || Kitt Peak || Spacewatch || — || align=right | 2.3 km || 
|-id=092 bgcolor=#d6d6d6
| 420092 ||  || — || March 14, 2010 || WISE || WISE || — || align=right | 3.9 km || 
|-id=093 bgcolor=#E9E9E9
| 420093 ||  || — || May 11, 2003 || Kitt Peak || Spacewatch || (5) || align=right data-sort-value="0.84" | 840 m || 
|-id=094 bgcolor=#d6d6d6
| 420094 ||  || — || March 12, 2011 || Mount Lemmon || Mount Lemmon Survey || — || align=right | 3.1 km || 
|-id=095 bgcolor=#d6d6d6
| 420095 ||  || — || August 29, 2002 || Palomar || NEAT || — || align=right | 3.3 km || 
|-id=096 bgcolor=#E9E9E9
| 420096 ||  || — || September 7, 2004 || Kitt Peak || Spacewatch || — || align=right | 2.5 km || 
|-id=097 bgcolor=#d6d6d6
| 420097 ||  || — || October 9, 2008 || Kitt Peak || Spacewatch || — || align=right | 3.3 km || 
|-id=098 bgcolor=#d6d6d6
| 420098 ||  || — || March 24, 2006 || Mount Lemmon || Mount Lemmon Survey || EOS || align=right | 1.7 km || 
|-id=099 bgcolor=#E9E9E9
| 420099 ||  || — || January 23, 2006 || Kitt Peak || Spacewatch || MRX || align=right | 1.3 km || 
|-id=100 bgcolor=#d6d6d6
| 420100 ||  || — || February 4, 2005 || Mount Lemmon || Mount Lemmon Survey || THM || align=right | 2.4 km || 
|}

420101–420200 

|-bgcolor=#d6d6d6
| 420101 ||  || — || February 2, 2006 || Kitt Peak || Spacewatch || — || align=right | 2.1 km || 
|-id=102 bgcolor=#d6d6d6
| 420102 ||  || — || January 28, 2011 || Kitt Peak || Spacewatch || — || align=right | 2.7 km || 
|-id=103 bgcolor=#E9E9E9
| 420103 ||  || — || October 23, 2001 || Palomar || LONEOS || — || align=right | 1.4 km || 
|-id=104 bgcolor=#d6d6d6
| 420104 ||  || — || October 7, 2008 || Mount Lemmon || Mount Lemmon Survey || EOS || align=right | 2.4 km || 
|-id=105 bgcolor=#d6d6d6
| 420105 ||  || — || November 27, 2009 || Mount Lemmon || Mount Lemmon Survey || EOS || align=right | 2.3 km || 
|-id=106 bgcolor=#E9E9E9
| 420106 ||  || — || April 6, 2003 || Anderson Mesa || LONEOS || — || align=right | 3.4 km || 
|-id=107 bgcolor=#d6d6d6
| 420107 ||  || — || January 8, 2011 || Mount Lemmon || Mount Lemmon Survey || — || align=right | 3.6 km || 
|-id=108 bgcolor=#E9E9E9
| 420108 ||  || — || December 18, 2001 || Socorro || LINEAR || — || align=right | 1.3 km || 
|-id=109 bgcolor=#d6d6d6
| 420109 ||  || — || February 24, 2006 || Kitt Peak || Spacewatch || — || align=right | 2.1 km || 
|-id=110 bgcolor=#d6d6d6
| 420110 ||  || — || September 7, 2008 || Mount Lemmon || Mount Lemmon Survey || — || align=right | 2.8 km || 
|-id=111 bgcolor=#d6d6d6
| 420111 ||  || — || March 14, 2011 || Mount Lemmon || Mount Lemmon Survey || — || align=right | 2.4 km || 
|-id=112 bgcolor=#E9E9E9
| 420112 ||  || — || March 13, 2002 || Socorro || LINEAR || — || align=right | 2.0 km || 
|-id=113 bgcolor=#d6d6d6
| 420113 ||  || — || September 6, 2008 || Mount Lemmon || Mount Lemmon Survey || VER || align=right | 3.0 km || 
|-id=114 bgcolor=#d6d6d6
| 420114 ||  || — || October 23, 2003 || Kitt Peak || Spacewatch || — || align=right | 3.1 km || 
|-id=115 bgcolor=#d6d6d6
| 420115 ||  || — || November 24, 2009 || Mount Lemmon || Mount Lemmon Survey || — || align=right | 4.0 km || 
|-id=116 bgcolor=#d6d6d6
| 420116 ||  || — || March 28, 2011 || Kitt Peak || Spacewatch || — || align=right | 2.8 km || 
|-id=117 bgcolor=#d6d6d6
| 420117 ||  || — || February 27, 2010 || WISE || WISE || — || align=right | 2.3 km || 
|-id=118 bgcolor=#E9E9E9
| 420118 ||  || — || December 26, 2005 || Mount Lemmon || Mount Lemmon Survey || — || align=right | 1.7 km || 
|-id=119 bgcolor=#d6d6d6
| 420119 ||  || — || November 20, 2008 || Mount Lemmon || Mount Lemmon Survey || — || align=right | 3.2 km || 
|-id=120 bgcolor=#d6d6d6
| 420120 ||  || — || February 24, 2006 || Catalina || CSS || BRA || align=right | 1.8 km || 
|-id=121 bgcolor=#d6d6d6
| 420121 ||  || — || May 12, 1996 || Kitt Peak || Spacewatch || EOS || align=right | 2.4 km || 
|-id=122 bgcolor=#d6d6d6
| 420122 ||  || — || December 16, 1993 || Kitt Peak || Spacewatch || EOS || align=right | 2.4 km || 
|-id=123 bgcolor=#d6d6d6
| 420123 ||  || — || March 5, 2011 || Kitt Peak || Spacewatch || — || align=right | 2.5 km || 
|-id=124 bgcolor=#d6d6d6
| 420124 ||  || — || March 17, 2010 || WISE || WISE || — || align=right | 4.4 km || 
|-id=125 bgcolor=#d6d6d6
| 420125 ||  || — || April 5, 2000 || Kitt Peak || Spacewatch || — || align=right | 2.6 km || 
|-id=126 bgcolor=#d6d6d6
| 420126 ||  || — || October 8, 2008 || Kitt Peak || Spacewatch || — || align=right | 3.2 km || 
|-id=127 bgcolor=#d6d6d6
| 420127 ||  || — || November 1, 2008 || Kitt Peak || Spacewatch || — || align=right | 3.5 km || 
|-id=128 bgcolor=#d6d6d6
| 420128 ||  || — || March 5, 2011 || Kitt Peak || Spacewatch || — || align=right | 3.1 km || 
|-id=129 bgcolor=#d6d6d6
| 420129 ||  || — || March 2, 2011 || Kitt Peak || Spacewatch || — || align=right | 2.9 km || 
|-id=130 bgcolor=#d6d6d6
| 420130 ||  || — || January 19, 1999 || Kitt Peak || Spacewatch || THM || align=right | 2.4 km || 
|-id=131 bgcolor=#d6d6d6
| 420131 ||  || — || September 29, 2008 || Mount Lemmon || Mount Lemmon Survey || — || align=right | 2.4 km || 
|-id=132 bgcolor=#d6d6d6
| 420132 ||  || — || February 26, 2011 || Kitt Peak || Spacewatch || — || align=right | 3.0 km || 
|-id=133 bgcolor=#d6d6d6
| 420133 ||  || — || February 24, 2006 || Kitt Peak || Spacewatch || KOR || align=right | 1.5 km || 
|-id=134 bgcolor=#d6d6d6
| 420134 ||  || — || September 30, 2003 || Kitt Peak || Spacewatch || — || align=right | 3.6 km || 
|-id=135 bgcolor=#E9E9E9
| 420135 ||  || — || November 20, 2009 || Mount Lemmon || Mount Lemmon Survey || — || align=right | 1.9 km || 
|-id=136 bgcolor=#d6d6d6
| 420136 ||  || — || March 27, 2011 || Mount Lemmon || Mount Lemmon Survey || — || align=right | 3.1 km || 
|-id=137 bgcolor=#d6d6d6
| 420137 ||  || — || October 22, 2003 || Apache Point || SDSS || — || align=right | 3.2 km || 
|-id=138 bgcolor=#d6d6d6
| 420138 ||  || — || September 17, 2003 || Kitt Peak || Spacewatch || EOS || align=right | 2.0 km || 
|-id=139 bgcolor=#E9E9E9
| 420139 ||  || — || September 20, 2008 || Mount Lemmon || Mount Lemmon Survey || — || align=right | 2.8 km || 
|-id=140 bgcolor=#d6d6d6
| 420140 ||  || — || September 23, 2008 || Mount Lemmon || Mount Lemmon Survey || EOS || align=right | 1.8 km || 
|-id=141 bgcolor=#d6d6d6
| 420141 ||  || — || October 24, 2008 || Kitt Peak || Spacewatch || THM || align=right | 2.9 km || 
|-id=142 bgcolor=#d6d6d6
| 420142 ||  || — || May 2, 2006 || Kitt Peak || Spacewatch || VER || align=right | 3.6 km || 
|-id=143 bgcolor=#E9E9E9
| 420143 ||  || — || March 9, 2011 || Mount Lemmon || Mount Lemmon Survey || EUN || align=right | 1.4 km || 
|-id=144 bgcolor=#E9E9E9
| 420144 ||  || — || April 22, 2007 || Mount Lemmon || Mount Lemmon Survey || — || align=right | 2.6 km || 
|-id=145 bgcolor=#d6d6d6
| 420145 ||  || — || March 25, 2006 || Mount Lemmon || Mount Lemmon Survey || — || align=right | 2.4 km || 
|-id=146 bgcolor=#d6d6d6
| 420146 ||  || — || September 30, 2003 || Kitt Peak || Spacewatch || — || align=right | 3.2 km || 
|-id=147 bgcolor=#d6d6d6
| 420147 ||  || — || September 20, 2008 || Mount Lemmon || Mount Lemmon Survey || — || align=right | 2.4 km || 
|-id=148 bgcolor=#d6d6d6
| 420148 ||  || — || January 19, 2005 || Kitt Peak || Spacewatch || — || align=right | 3.2 km || 
|-id=149 bgcolor=#d6d6d6
| 420149 ||  || — || January 13, 2005 || Kitt Peak || Spacewatch || — || align=right | 3.1 km || 
|-id=150 bgcolor=#d6d6d6
| 420150 ||  || — || January 30, 2011 || Kitt Peak || Spacewatch || — || align=right | 3.3 km || 
|-id=151 bgcolor=#d6d6d6
| 420151 ||  || — || September 13, 2002 || Palomar || NEAT || — || align=right | 3.4 km || 
|-id=152 bgcolor=#d6d6d6
| 420152 ||  || — || October 8, 2008 || Kitt Peak || Spacewatch || — || align=right | 2.9 km || 
|-id=153 bgcolor=#d6d6d6
| 420153 ||  || — || March 25, 2006 || Mount Lemmon || Mount Lemmon Survey || — || align=right | 2.5 km || 
|-id=154 bgcolor=#d6d6d6
| 420154 ||  || — || March 7, 2011 || Siding Spring || SSS || — || align=right | 3.4 km || 
|-id=155 bgcolor=#E9E9E9
| 420155 ||  || — || February 10, 2011 || Catalina || CSS || — || align=right | 1.6 km || 
|-id=156 bgcolor=#d6d6d6
| 420156 ||  || — || September 10, 2007 || Mount Lemmon || Mount Lemmon Survey || — || align=right | 5.8 km || 
|-id=157 bgcolor=#d6d6d6
| 420157 ||  || — || March 29, 2011 || Catalina || CSS || — || align=right | 3.6 km || 
|-id=158 bgcolor=#E9E9E9
| 420158 ||  || — || November 28, 2005 || Mount Lemmon || Mount Lemmon Survey || JUN || align=right | 1.3 km || 
|-id=159 bgcolor=#d6d6d6
| 420159 ||  || — || February 5, 2011 || Mount Lemmon || Mount Lemmon Survey || — || align=right | 3.2 km || 
|-id=160 bgcolor=#d6d6d6
| 420160 ||  || — || May 7, 2010 || WISE || WISE || — || align=right | 4.3 km || 
|-id=161 bgcolor=#d6d6d6
| 420161 ||  || — || September 9, 2008 || Kitt Peak || Spacewatch || — || align=right | 2.8 km || 
|-id=162 bgcolor=#d6d6d6
| 420162 ||  || — || November 2, 2008 || Mount Lemmon || Mount Lemmon Survey || — || align=right | 3.8 km || 
|-id=163 bgcolor=#E9E9E9
| 420163 ||  || — || March 14, 2011 || Kitt Peak || Spacewatch || — || align=right | 2.6 km || 
|-id=164 bgcolor=#E9E9E9
| 420164 ||  || — || January 8, 2011 || Mount Lemmon || Mount Lemmon Survey || — || align=right | 3.0 km || 
|-id=165 bgcolor=#d6d6d6
| 420165 ||  || — || May 7, 2006 || Mount Lemmon || Mount Lemmon Survey || — || align=right | 3.4 km || 
|-id=166 bgcolor=#E9E9E9
| 420166 ||  || — || December 22, 2005 || Kitt Peak || Spacewatch || AEO || align=right | 2.0 km || 
|-id=167 bgcolor=#d6d6d6
| 420167 ||  || — || April 1, 2011 || Mount Lemmon || Mount Lemmon Survey || — || align=right | 2.9 km || 
|-id=168 bgcolor=#d6d6d6
| 420168 ||  || — || September 2, 2008 || Kitt Peak || Spacewatch || EOS || align=right | 1.7 km || 
|-id=169 bgcolor=#d6d6d6
| 420169 ||  || — || March 11, 2011 || Mount Lemmon || Mount Lemmon Survey || — || align=right | 2.9 km || 
|-id=170 bgcolor=#E9E9E9
| 420170 ||  || — || April 4, 2002 || Purple Mountain || NEAT || — || align=right | 2.3 km || 
|-id=171 bgcolor=#E9E9E9
| 420171 ||  || — || December 10, 2005 || Kitt Peak || Spacewatch || — || align=right | 2.5 km || 
|-id=172 bgcolor=#d6d6d6
| 420172 ||  || — || March 26, 2006 || Mount Lemmon || Mount Lemmon Survey || EOS || align=right | 1.6 km || 
|-id=173 bgcolor=#d6d6d6
| 420173 ||  || — || October 8, 2008 || Kitt Peak || Spacewatch || — || align=right | 2.9 km || 
|-id=174 bgcolor=#d6d6d6
| 420174 ||  || — || October 24, 2008 || Kitt Peak || Spacewatch || — || align=right | 2.9 km || 
|-id=175 bgcolor=#E9E9E9
| 420175 ||  || — || March 8, 1997 || Kitt Peak || Spacewatch || — || align=right | 1.6 km || 
|-id=176 bgcolor=#d6d6d6
| 420176 ||  || — || May 21, 2006 || Kitt Peak || Spacewatch || — || align=right | 2.7 km || 
|-id=177 bgcolor=#fefefe
| 420177 ||  || — || September 13, 2002 || Palomar || NEAT || — || align=right data-sort-value="0.79" | 790 m || 
|-id=178 bgcolor=#d6d6d6
| 420178 ||  || — || December 20, 2009 || Mount Lemmon || Mount Lemmon Survey || — || align=right | 3.5 km || 
|-id=179 bgcolor=#d6d6d6
| 420179 ||  || — || October 30, 2008 || Mount Lemmon || Mount Lemmon Survey || VER || align=right | 3.2 km || 
|-id=180 bgcolor=#d6d6d6
| 420180 ||  || — || March 4, 2006 || Kitt Peak || Spacewatch || — || align=right | 3.5 km || 
|-id=181 bgcolor=#d6d6d6
| 420181 ||  || — || March 24, 2006 || Mount Lemmon || Mount Lemmon Survey || — || align=right | 2.9 km || 
|-id=182 bgcolor=#E9E9E9
| 420182 ||  || — || May 16, 2007 || Mount Lemmon || Mount Lemmon Survey || — || align=right | 1.7 km || 
|-id=183 bgcolor=#E9E9E9
| 420183 ||  || — || March 1, 2011 || Mount Lemmon || Mount Lemmon Survey || EUN || align=right | 1.8 km || 
|-id=184 bgcolor=#d6d6d6
| 420184 ||  || — || September 7, 2008 || Mount Lemmon || Mount Lemmon Survey || KOR || align=right | 1.4 km || 
|-id=185 bgcolor=#d6d6d6
| 420185 ||  || — || September 4, 2008 || Kitt Peak || Spacewatch || — || align=right | 3.1 km || 
|-id=186 bgcolor=#d6d6d6
| 420186 ||  || — || September 25, 2008 || Mount Lemmon || Mount Lemmon Survey || — || align=right | 2.3 km || 
|-id=187 bgcolor=#FFC2E0
| 420187 ||  || — || October 10, 2008 || Catalina || CSS || AMO +1km || align=right data-sort-value="0.83" | 830 m || 
|-id=188 bgcolor=#d6d6d6
| 420188 ||  || — || February 27, 2006 || Kitt Peak || Spacewatch || — || align=right | 3.1 km || 
|-id=189 bgcolor=#d6d6d6
| 420189 ||  || — || March 25, 2006 || Kitt Peak || Spacewatch || — || align=right | 3.0 km || 
|-id=190 bgcolor=#d6d6d6
| 420190 ||  || — || March 28, 2010 || WISE || WISE || — || align=right | 4.4 km || 
|-id=191 bgcolor=#d6d6d6
| 420191 ||  || — || September 2, 2008 || Kitt Peak || Spacewatch || — || align=right | 2.9 km || 
|-id=192 bgcolor=#E9E9E9
| 420192 ||  || — || May 17, 2002 || Kitt Peak || Spacewatch || — || align=right | 2.2 km || 
|-id=193 bgcolor=#d6d6d6
| 420193 ||  || — || December 19, 2009 || Mount Lemmon || Mount Lemmon Survey || — || align=right | 2.4 km || 
|-id=194 bgcolor=#d6d6d6
| 420194 ||  || — || April 30, 2006 || Kitt Peak || Spacewatch || — || align=right | 2.4 km || 
|-id=195 bgcolor=#d6d6d6
| 420195 ||  || — || March 14, 2011 || Catalina || CSS || — || align=right | 4.4 km || 
|-id=196 bgcolor=#E9E9E9
| 420196 ||  || — || March 10, 2002 || Palomar || NEAT || — || align=right | 2.3 km || 
|-id=197 bgcolor=#d6d6d6
| 420197 ||  || — || October 17, 2009 || Mount Lemmon || Mount Lemmon Survey || — || align=right | 3.1 km || 
|-id=198 bgcolor=#d6d6d6
| 420198 ||  || — || April 29, 2010 || WISE || WISE || VER || align=right | 3.2 km || 
|-id=199 bgcolor=#d6d6d6
| 420199 ||  || — || October 25, 2008 || Kitt Peak || Spacewatch || EOS || align=right | 2.9 km || 
|-id=200 bgcolor=#d6d6d6
| 420200 ||  || — || March 12, 2005 || Kitt Peak || Spacewatch || — || align=right | 2.7 km || 
|}

420201–420300 

|-bgcolor=#d6d6d6
| 420201 ||  || — || November 23, 2003 || Kitt Peak || Spacewatch || — || align=right | 3.8 km || 
|-id=202 bgcolor=#E9E9E9
| 420202 ||  || — || December 15, 2009 || Mount Lemmon || Mount Lemmon Survey || — || align=right | 3.1 km || 
|-id=203 bgcolor=#d6d6d6
| 420203 ||  || — || March 11, 2005 || Kitt Peak || Spacewatch || — || align=right | 3.1 km || 
|-id=204 bgcolor=#d6d6d6
| 420204 ||  || — || March 25, 2011 || Kitt Peak || Spacewatch || — || align=right | 3.1 km || 
|-id=205 bgcolor=#E9E9E9
| 420205 ||  || — || October 6, 2004 || Kitt Peak || Spacewatch || — || align=right | 2.7 km || 
|-id=206 bgcolor=#E9E9E9
| 420206 ||  || — || December 27, 2005 || Kitt Peak || Spacewatch || — || align=right | 1.3 km || 
|-id=207 bgcolor=#d6d6d6
| 420207 ||  || — || November 10, 2004 || Kitt Peak || Spacewatch || — || align=right | 2.3 km || 
|-id=208 bgcolor=#d6d6d6
| 420208 ||  || — || December 25, 1998 || Kitt Peak || Spacewatch || — || align=right | 3.7 km || 
|-id=209 bgcolor=#d6d6d6
| 420209 ||  || — || December 10, 2009 || Mount Lemmon || Mount Lemmon Survey || — || align=right | 2.3 km || 
|-id=210 bgcolor=#FFC2E0
| 420210 ||  || — || April 22, 2011 || Kitt Peak || Spacewatch || APOPHA || align=right data-sort-value="0.29" | 290 m || 
|-id=211 bgcolor=#d6d6d6
| 420211 ||  || — || October 5, 2002 || Apache Point || SDSS || — || align=right | 4.3 km || 
|-id=212 bgcolor=#E9E9E9
| 420212 ||  || — || November 23, 2009 || Mount Lemmon || Mount Lemmon Survey || — || align=right | 2.1 km || 
|-id=213 bgcolor=#d6d6d6
| 420213 ||  || — || February 2, 2005 || Socorro || LINEAR || — || align=right | 3.4 km || 
|-id=214 bgcolor=#d6d6d6
| 420214 ||  || — || October 29, 2002 || Apache Point || SDSS || VER || align=right | 2.6 km || 
|-id=215 bgcolor=#d6d6d6
| 420215 ||  || — || April 30, 2006 || Kitt Peak || Spacewatch || — || align=right | 2.7 km || 
|-id=216 bgcolor=#d6d6d6
| 420216 ||  || — || December 20, 2009 || Mount Lemmon || Mount Lemmon Survey || — || align=right | 2.2 km || 
|-id=217 bgcolor=#E9E9E9
| 420217 ||  || — || October 22, 2005 || Kitt Peak || Spacewatch || — || align=right | 1.7 km || 
|-id=218 bgcolor=#d6d6d6
| 420218 ||  || — || April 27, 2000 || Socorro || LINEAR || — || align=right | 3.4 km || 
|-id=219 bgcolor=#E9E9E9
| 420219 ||  || — || October 7, 2008 || Mount Lemmon || Mount Lemmon Survey || — || align=right | 2.0 km || 
|-id=220 bgcolor=#d6d6d6
| 420220 ||  || — || April 2, 2006 || Kitt Peak || Spacewatch || — || align=right | 2.3 km || 
|-id=221 bgcolor=#d6d6d6
| 420221 ||  || — || October 26, 2008 || Kitt Peak || Spacewatch || — || align=right | 2.8 km || 
|-id=222 bgcolor=#d6d6d6
| 420222 ||  || — || March 14, 2011 || Mount Lemmon || Mount Lemmon Survey || — || align=right | 2.8 km || 
|-id=223 bgcolor=#d6d6d6
| 420223 ||  || — || March 19, 2005 || Siding Spring || SSS || — || align=right | 4.2 km || 
|-id=224 bgcolor=#d6d6d6
| 420224 ||  || — || December 1, 2003 || Kitt Peak || Spacewatch || — || align=right | 2.9 km || 
|-id=225 bgcolor=#d6d6d6
| 420225 ||  || — || November 7, 2008 || Mount Lemmon || Mount Lemmon Survey || — || align=right | 3.5 km || 
|-id=226 bgcolor=#d6d6d6
| 420226 ||  || — || May 24, 2000 || Kitt Peak || Spacewatch || — || align=right | 3.3 km || 
|-id=227 bgcolor=#E9E9E9
| 420227 ||  || — || December 14, 2004 || Kitt Peak || Spacewatch || — || align=right | 2.8 km || 
|-id=228 bgcolor=#d6d6d6
| 420228 ||  || — || April 28, 2011 || Kitt Peak || Spacewatch || — || align=right | 3.0 km || 
|-id=229 bgcolor=#d6d6d6
| 420229 ||  || — || September 23, 2008 || Mount Lemmon || Mount Lemmon Survey || — || align=right | 2.7 km || 
|-id=230 bgcolor=#d6d6d6
| 420230 ||  || — || October 29, 2008 || Mount Lemmon || Mount Lemmon Survey || VER || align=right | 2.5 km || 
|-id=231 bgcolor=#E9E9E9
| 420231 ||  || — || December 20, 2009 || Mount Lemmon || Mount Lemmon Survey || — || align=right | 2.8 km || 
|-id=232 bgcolor=#d6d6d6
| 420232 ||  || — || October 7, 2008 || Mount Lemmon || Mount Lemmon Survey || — || align=right | 2.9 km || 
|-id=233 bgcolor=#E9E9E9
| 420233 ||  || — || December 25, 2009 || Kitt Peak || Spacewatch || — || align=right | 1.9 km || 
|-id=234 bgcolor=#E9E9E9
| 420234 ||  || — || October 16, 2009 || Mount Lemmon || Mount Lemmon Survey || — || align=right | 4.1 km || 
|-id=235 bgcolor=#d6d6d6
| 420235 ||  || — || November 24, 2003 || Kitt Peak || Spacewatch || — || align=right | 3.1 km || 
|-id=236 bgcolor=#d6d6d6
| 420236 ||  || — || April 29, 2011 || Catalina || CSS || — || align=right | 5.1 km || 
|-id=237 bgcolor=#d6d6d6
| 420237 ||  || — || April 22, 2011 || Kitt Peak || Spacewatch || — || align=right | 3.1 km || 
|-id=238 bgcolor=#d6d6d6
| 420238 ||  || — || October 23, 2003 || Kitt Peak || Spacewatch || — || align=right | 3.0 km || 
|-id=239 bgcolor=#d6d6d6
| 420239 ||  || — || January 6, 2010 || Kitt Peak || Spacewatch || — || align=right | 3.7 km || 
|-id=240 bgcolor=#d6d6d6
| 420240 ||  || — || November 13, 2002 || Palomar || NEAT || — || align=right | 3.6 km || 
|-id=241 bgcolor=#d6d6d6
| 420241 ||  || — || March 9, 2005 || Catalina || CSS || — || align=right | 4.0 km || 
|-id=242 bgcolor=#d6d6d6
| 420242 ||  || — || October 6, 2008 || Mount Lemmon || Mount Lemmon Survey || — || align=right | 3.3 km || 
|-id=243 bgcolor=#d6d6d6
| 420243 ||  || — || May 8, 2010 || WISE || WISE || SYL7:4 || align=right | 4.3 km || 
|-id=244 bgcolor=#d6d6d6
| 420244 ||  || — || May 9, 2006 || Mount Lemmon || Mount Lemmon Survey || — || align=right | 3.2 km || 
|-id=245 bgcolor=#d6d6d6
| 420245 ||  || — || October 2, 2008 || Kitt Peak || Spacewatch || — || align=right | 3.5 km || 
|-id=246 bgcolor=#d6d6d6
| 420246 ||  || — || April 5, 2011 || Kitt Peak || Spacewatch || — || align=right | 3.9 km || 
|-id=247 bgcolor=#d6d6d6
| 420247 ||  || — || September 3, 2008 || Kitt Peak || Spacewatch || EOS || align=right | 1.7 km || 
|-id=248 bgcolor=#d6d6d6
| 420248 ||  || — || January 12, 2010 || Catalina || CSS || — || align=right | 4.6 km || 
|-id=249 bgcolor=#d6d6d6
| 420249 ||  || — || March 1, 2005 || Kitt Peak || Spacewatch || — || align=right | 2.7 km || 
|-id=250 bgcolor=#fefefe
| 420250 ||  || — || October 8, 1996 || Kitt Peak || Spacewatch || H || align=right data-sort-value="0.59" | 590 m || 
|-id=251 bgcolor=#d6d6d6
| 420251 ||  || — || March 12, 2005 || Socorro || LINEAR || Tj (2.99) || align=right | 4.9 km || 
|-id=252 bgcolor=#d6d6d6
| 420252 ||  || — || April 19, 2010 || WISE || WISE || — || align=right | 3.5 km || 
|-id=253 bgcolor=#C2FFFF
| 420253 ||  || — || March 30, 2010 || WISE || WISE || L5 || align=right | 15 km || 
|-id=254 bgcolor=#E9E9E9
| 420254 ||  || — || April 24, 2011 || Kitt Peak || Spacewatch || — || align=right | 2.8 km || 
|-id=255 bgcolor=#d6d6d6
| 420255 ||  || — || January 14, 2011 || Mount Lemmon || Mount Lemmon Survey || — || align=right | 4.0 km || 
|-id=256 bgcolor=#d6d6d6
| 420256 ||  || — || March 4, 2000 || Socorro || LINEAR || — || align=right | 3.3 km || 
|-id=257 bgcolor=#d6d6d6
| 420257 ||  || — || October 10, 2002 || Apache Point || SDSS || — || align=right | 3.6 km || 
|-id=258 bgcolor=#d6d6d6
| 420258 ||  || — || November 18, 2003 || Kitt Peak || Spacewatch || — || align=right | 2.9 km || 
|-id=259 bgcolor=#d6d6d6
| 420259 ||  || — || March 13, 2005 || Anderson Mesa || LONEOS || — || align=right | 2.9 km || 
|-id=260 bgcolor=#d6d6d6
| 420260 ||  || — || April 16, 2004 || Kitt Peak || Spacewatch || 7:4 || align=right | 3.9 km || 
|-id=261 bgcolor=#d6d6d6
| 420261 ||  || — || April 28, 2011 || Kitt Peak || Spacewatch || — || align=right | 3.8 km || 
|-id=262 bgcolor=#FFC2E0
| 420262 ||  || — || May 25, 2011 || Siding Spring || SSS || APO || align=right data-sort-value="0.33" | 330 m || 
|-id=263 bgcolor=#E9E9E9
| 420263 ||  || — || March 29, 2010 || WISE || WISE || — || align=right | 3.3 km || 
|-id=264 bgcolor=#d6d6d6
| 420264 ||  || — || May 4, 2005 || Catalina || CSS || Tj (2.99) || align=right | 4.7 km || 
|-id=265 bgcolor=#C2FFFF
| 420265 ||  || — || December 18, 2003 || Kitt Peak || Spacewatch || L5 || align=right | 15 km || 
|-id=266 bgcolor=#C2FFFF
| 420266 ||  || — || April 11, 2010 || WISE || WISE || L5 || align=right | 11 km || 
|-id=267 bgcolor=#d6d6d6
| 420267 ||  || — || December 19, 2003 || Kitt Peak || Spacewatch || EOS || align=right | 2.1 km || 
|-id=268 bgcolor=#fefefe
| 420268 ||  || — || May 22, 2011 || Kitt Peak || Spacewatch || H || align=right data-sort-value="0.85" | 850 m || 
|-id=269 bgcolor=#d6d6d6
| 420269 ||  || — || March 21, 2010 || Catalina || CSS || — || align=right | 4.3 km || 
|-id=270 bgcolor=#d6d6d6
| 420270 ||  || — || December 31, 2008 || Kitt Peak || Spacewatch || (6124)3:2 || align=right | 5.1 km || 
|-id=271 bgcolor=#d6d6d6
| 420271 ||  || — || April 13, 2010 || WISE || WISE || — || align=right | 2.3 km || 
|-id=272 bgcolor=#d6d6d6
| 420272 ||  || — || March 16, 2005 || Mount Lemmon || Mount Lemmon Survey || — || align=right | 2.9 km || 
|-id=273 bgcolor=#d6d6d6
| 420273 ||  || — || December 3, 2008 || Mount Lemmon || Mount Lemmon Survey || EOS || align=right | 2.4 km || 
|-id=274 bgcolor=#d6d6d6
| 420274 ||  || — || November 7, 2008 || Mount Lemmon || Mount Lemmon Survey || — || align=right | 3.6 km || 
|-id=275 bgcolor=#d6d6d6
| 420275 ||  || — || December 1, 2008 || Kitt Peak || Spacewatch || EOS || align=right | 2.2 km || 
|-id=276 bgcolor=#C2FFFF
| 420276 ||  || — || June 8, 2011 || Mount Lemmon || Mount Lemmon Survey || L5 || align=right | 7.2 km || 
|-id=277 bgcolor=#d6d6d6
| 420277 ||  || — || January 8, 2010 || Mount Lemmon || Mount Lemmon Survey || — || align=right | 3.4 km || 
|-id=278 bgcolor=#d6d6d6
| 420278 ||  || — || February 4, 2005 || Mount Lemmon || Mount Lemmon Survey || — || align=right | 2.5 km || 
|-id=279 bgcolor=#fefefe
| 420279 ||  || — || January 8, 2010 || Catalina || CSS || H || align=right data-sort-value="0.84" | 840 m || 
|-id=280 bgcolor=#fefefe
| 420280 ||  || — || May 29, 2003 || Apache Point || SDSS || H || align=right data-sort-value="0.66" | 660 m || 
|-id=281 bgcolor=#C2FFFF
| 420281 ||  || — || March 29, 2010 || WISE || WISE || L5 || align=right | 11 km || 
|-id=282 bgcolor=#fefefe
| 420282 ||  || — || September 20, 2001 || Socorro || LINEAR || H || align=right data-sort-value="0.80" | 800 m || 
|-id=283 bgcolor=#C2FFFF
| 420283 ||  || — || January 16, 2005 || Kitt Peak || Spacewatch || L5 || align=right | 9.5 km || 
|-id=284 bgcolor=#fefefe
| 420284 ||  || — || December 20, 2009 || Mount Lemmon || Mount Lemmon Survey || H || align=right data-sort-value="0.90" | 900 m || 
|-id=285 bgcolor=#C2FFFF
| 420285 ||  || — || August 24, 2011 || Siding Spring || SSS || L5 || align=right | 9.2 km || 
|-id=286 bgcolor=#FFC2E0
| 420286 ||  || — || September 5, 2011 || Haleakala || Pan-STARRS || APO || align=right data-sort-value="0.66" | 660 m || 
|-id=287 bgcolor=#E9E9E9
| 420287 ||  || — || November 1, 2007 || Kitt Peak || Spacewatch || — || align=right | 1.5 km || 
|-id=288 bgcolor=#fefefe
| 420288 ||  || — || October 22, 2003 || Socorro || LINEAR || H || align=right | 1.1 km || 
|-id=289 bgcolor=#C2FFFF
| 420289 ||  || — || September 7, 2000 || Kitt Peak || Spacewatch || L5 || align=right | 9.0 km || 
|-id=290 bgcolor=#fefefe
| 420290 ||  || — || March 15, 2007 || Mount Lemmon || Mount Lemmon Survey || — || align=right data-sort-value="0.72" | 720 m || 
|-id=291 bgcolor=#fefefe
| 420291 ||  || — || January 1, 2009 || Mount Lemmon || Mount Lemmon Survey || — || align=right data-sort-value="0.81" | 810 m || 
|-id=292 bgcolor=#fefefe
| 420292 ||  || — || September 24, 2011 || Catalina || CSS || H || align=right data-sort-value="0.68" | 680 m || 
|-id=293 bgcolor=#fefefe
| 420293 ||  || — || April 9, 2010 || Mount Lemmon || Mount Lemmon Survey || H || align=right data-sort-value="0.64" | 640 m || 
|-id=294 bgcolor=#fefefe
| 420294 ||  || — || October 22, 2011 || Kitt Peak || Spacewatch || — || align=right data-sort-value="0.95" | 950 m || 
|-id=295 bgcolor=#fefefe
| 420295 ||  || — || May 11, 2010 || Mount Lemmon || Mount Lemmon Survey || H || align=right data-sort-value="0.61" | 610 m || 
|-id=296 bgcolor=#fefefe
| 420296 ||  || — || November 1, 2011 || Mount Lemmon || Mount Lemmon Survey || — || align=right data-sort-value="0.58" | 580 m || 
|-id=297 bgcolor=#fefefe
| 420297 ||  || — || October 7, 2001 || Palomar || NEAT || — || align=right | 1.0 km || 
|-id=298 bgcolor=#fefefe
| 420298 ||  || — || December 18, 2003 || Socorro || LINEAR || H || align=right data-sort-value="0.89" | 890 m || 
|-id=299 bgcolor=#fefefe
| 420299 ||  || — || December 27, 2003 || Socorro || LINEAR || H || align=right data-sort-value="0.85" | 850 m || 
|-id=300 bgcolor=#fefefe
| 420300 ||  || — || February 6, 2007 || Mount Lemmon || Mount Lemmon Survey || H || align=right data-sort-value="0.82" | 820 m || 
|}

420301–420400 

|-bgcolor=#fefefe
| 420301 ||  || — || September 10, 2007 || Mount Lemmon || Mount Lemmon Survey || — || align=right data-sort-value="0.63" | 630 m || 
|-id=302 bgcolor=#FFC2E0
| 420302 ||  || — || December 6, 2011 || Haleakala || Pan-STARRS || AMO +1km || align=right data-sort-value="0.97" | 970 m || 
|-id=303 bgcolor=#fefefe
| 420303 ||  || — || December 25, 2011 || Catalina || CSS || H || align=right data-sort-value="0.90" | 900 m || 
|-id=304 bgcolor=#fefefe
| 420304 ||  || — || September 7, 2004 || Kitt Peak || Spacewatch || — || align=right data-sort-value="0.54" | 540 m || 
|-id=305 bgcolor=#fefefe
| 420305 ||  || — || November 27, 2011 || Mount Lemmon || Mount Lemmon Survey || — || align=right data-sort-value="0.78" | 780 m || 
|-id=306 bgcolor=#fefefe
| 420306 ||  || — || September 14, 2007 || Mount Lemmon || Mount Lemmon Survey || — || align=right data-sort-value="0.75" | 750 m || 
|-id=307 bgcolor=#fefefe
| 420307 ||  || — || September 11, 2007 || Mount Lemmon || Mount Lemmon Survey || — || align=right data-sort-value="0.63" | 630 m || 
|-id=308 bgcolor=#fefefe
| 420308 ||  || — || December 16, 2007 || Mount Lemmon || Mount Lemmon Survey || — || align=right data-sort-value="0.86" | 860 m || 
|-id=309 bgcolor=#fefefe
| 420309 ||  || — || September 10, 2007 || Kitt Peak || Spacewatch || — || align=right data-sort-value="0.58" | 580 m || 
|-id=310 bgcolor=#fefefe
| 420310 ||  || — || December 14, 2004 || Kitt Peak || Spacewatch || — || align=right data-sort-value="0.70" | 700 m || 
|-id=311 bgcolor=#fefefe
| 420311 ||  || — || December 29, 2011 || Kitt Peak || Spacewatch || — || align=right data-sort-value="0.73" | 730 m || 
|-id=312 bgcolor=#fefefe
| 420312 ||  || — || October 8, 2004 || Kitt Peak || Spacewatch || — || align=right data-sort-value="0.65" | 650 m || 
|-id=313 bgcolor=#C2FFFF
| 420313 ||  || — || April 18, 2010 || WISE || WISE || L5 || align=right | 13 km || 
|-id=314 bgcolor=#fefefe
| 420314 ||  || — || December 28, 2007 || Kitt Peak || Spacewatch || — || align=right | 1.0 km || 
|-id=315 bgcolor=#fefefe
| 420315 ||  || — || March 21, 1999 || Apache Point || SDSS || — || align=right data-sort-value="0.82" | 820 m || 
|-id=316 bgcolor=#fefefe
| 420316 ||  || — || September 5, 2010 || Mount Lemmon || Mount Lemmon Survey || — || align=right | 1.2 km || 
|-id=317 bgcolor=#E9E9E9
| 420317 ||  || — || January 30, 1995 || Kitt Peak || Spacewatch || MAR || align=right | 1.2 km || 
|-id=318 bgcolor=#E9E9E9
| 420318 ||  || — || February 2, 2008 || Catalina || CSS || — || align=right | 2.0 km || 
|-id=319 bgcolor=#fefefe
| 420319 ||  || — || March 25, 2009 || Mount Lemmon || Mount Lemmon Survey || — || align=right | 1.0 km || 
|-id=320 bgcolor=#fefefe
| 420320 ||  || — || December 14, 2001 || Socorro || LINEAR || — || align=right data-sort-value="0.78" | 780 m || 
|-id=321 bgcolor=#fefefe
| 420321 ||  || — || April 4, 2002 || Palomar || NEAT || — || align=right data-sort-value="0.70" | 700 m || 
|-id=322 bgcolor=#fefefe
| 420322 ||  || — || February 6, 2002 || Palomar || NEAT || — || align=right data-sort-value="0.72" | 720 m || 
|-id=323 bgcolor=#fefefe
| 420323 ||  || — || November 2, 2007 || Kitt Peak || Spacewatch || V || align=right data-sort-value="0.59" | 590 m || 
|-id=324 bgcolor=#fefefe
| 420324 ||  || — || May 6, 2006 || Kitt Peak || Spacewatch || — || align=right data-sort-value="0.71" | 710 m || 
|-id=325 bgcolor=#fefefe
| 420325 ||  || — || September 15, 2007 || Kitt Peak || Spacewatch || — || align=right data-sort-value="0.76" | 760 m || 
|-id=326 bgcolor=#fefefe
| 420326 ||  || — || December 11, 2004 || Kitt Peak || Spacewatch || — || align=right data-sort-value="0.67" | 670 m || 
|-id=327 bgcolor=#fefefe
| 420327 ||  || — || February 22, 2002 || Palomar || NEAT || — || align=right data-sort-value="0.57" | 570 m || 
|-id=328 bgcolor=#fefefe
| 420328 ||  || — || May 11, 2005 || Mount Lemmon || Mount Lemmon Survey || — || align=right data-sort-value="0.92" | 920 m || 
|-id=329 bgcolor=#fefefe
| 420329 ||  || — || September 18, 2003 || Palomar || NEAT || — || align=right | 1.0 km || 
|-id=330 bgcolor=#fefefe
| 420330 ||  || — || March 17, 2005 || Kitt Peak || Spacewatch || — || align=right data-sort-value="0.65" | 650 m || 
|-id=331 bgcolor=#fefefe
| 420331 ||  || — || January 31, 1995 || Kitt Peak || Spacewatch || — || align=right data-sort-value="0.76" | 760 m || 
|-id=332 bgcolor=#E9E9E9
| 420332 ||  || — || December 28, 2011 || Mount Lemmon || Mount Lemmon Survey || — || align=right | 1.8 km || 
|-id=333 bgcolor=#fefefe
| 420333 ||  || — || November 20, 2007 || Kitt Peak || Spacewatch || — || align=right data-sort-value="0.76" | 760 m || 
|-id=334 bgcolor=#fefefe
| 420334 ||  || — || December 10, 2004 || Kitt Peak || Spacewatch || — || align=right data-sort-value="0.85" | 850 m || 
|-id=335 bgcolor=#fefefe
| 420335 ||  || — || January 29, 2004 || Socorro || LINEAR || H || align=right data-sort-value="0.93" | 930 m || 
|-id=336 bgcolor=#fefefe
| 420336 ||  || — || January 18, 2012 || Catalina || CSS || — || align=right data-sort-value="0.95" | 950 m || 
|-id=337 bgcolor=#fefefe
| 420337 ||  || — || January 6, 2005 || Socorro || LINEAR || — || align=right data-sort-value="0.72" | 720 m || 
|-id=338 bgcolor=#fefefe
| 420338 ||  || — || February 28, 2009 || Mount Lemmon || Mount Lemmon Survey || — || align=right data-sort-value="0.65" | 650 m || 
|-id=339 bgcolor=#fefefe
| 420339 ||  || — || January 10, 2008 || Mount Lemmon || Mount Lemmon Survey || MAS || align=right data-sort-value="0.72" | 720 m || 
|-id=340 bgcolor=#fefefe
| 420340 ||  || — || September 11, 2007 || Kitt Peak || Spacewatch || — || align=right data-sort-value="0.65" | 650 m || 
|-id=341 bgcolor=#fefefe
| 420341 ||  || — || December 14, 2004 || Campo Imperatore || CINEOS || V || align=right data-sort-value="0.72" | 720 m || 
|-id=342 bgcolor=#fefefe
| 420342 ||  || — || October 1, 2003 || Kitt Peak || Spacewatch || — || align=right | 2.6 km || 
|-id=343 bgcolor=#fefefe
| 420343 ||  || — || March 24, 2009 || Mount Lemmon || Mount Lemmon Survey || — || align=right data-sort-value="0.53" | 530 m || 
|-id=344 bgcolor=#fefefe
| 420344 ||  || — || April 12, 2005 || Kitt Peak || Spacewatch || MAS || align=right data-sort-value="0.65" | 650 m || 
|-id=345 bgcolor=#fefefe
| 420345 ||  || — || February 10, 2002 || Socorro || LINEAR || — || align=right data-sort-value="0.75" | 750 m || 
|-id=346 bgcolor=#fefefe
| 420346 ||  || — || March 11, 2005 || Kitt Peak || Spacewatch || — || align=right data-sort-value="0.66" | 660 m || 
|-id=347 bgcolor=#fefefe
| 420347 ||  || — || February 28, 2009 || Kitt Peak || Spacewatch || — || align=right | 1.0 km || 
|-id=348 bgcolor=#fefefe
| 420348 ||  || — || September 30, 2003 || Apache Point || SDSS || — || align=right data-sort-value="0.74" | 740 m || 
|-id=349 bgcolor=#fefefe
| 420349 ||  || — || December 14, 2001 || Socorro || LINEAR || — || align=right data-sort-value="0.88" | 880 m || 
|-id=350 bgcolor=#fefefe
| 420350 ||  || — || January 19, 2005 || Kitt Peak || Spacewatch || — || align=right data-sort-value="0.72" | 720 m || 
|-id=351 bgcolor=#fefefe
| 420351 ||  || — || February 7, 2002 || Palomar || NEAT || — || align=right data-sort-value="0.71" | 710 m || 
|-id=352 bgcolor=#fefefe
| 420352 ||  || — || November 19, 2007 || Mount Lemmon || Mount Lemmon Survey || — || align=right data-sort-value="0.80" | 800 m || 
|-id=353 bgcolor=#fefefe
| 420353 ||  || — || January 13, 2005 || Kitt Peak || Spacewatch || V || align=right data-sort-value="0.51" | 510 m || 
|-id=354 bgcolor=#fefefe
| 420354 ||  || — || September 10, 2007 || Mount Lemmon || Mount Lemmon Survey || — || align=right data-sort-value="0.59" | 590 m || 
|-id=355 bgcolor=#fefefe
| 420355 ||  || — || November 20, 2007 || Mount Lemmon || Mount Lemmon Survey || — || align=right data-sort-value="0.69" | 690 m || 
|-id=356 bgcolor=#C2E0FF
| 420356 Praamzius ||  ||  || January 23, 2012 || Mount Graham || K. Černis, R. P. Boyle || cubewano (cold)critical || align=right | 314 km || 
|-id=357 bgcolor=#fefefe
| 420357 ||  || — || October 18, 2003 || Kitt Peak || Spacewatch || — || align=right data-sort-value="0.96" | 960 m || 
|-id=358 bgcolor=#fefefe
| 420358 ||  || — || October 15, 2004 || Kitt Peak || Spacewatch || — || align=right data-sort-value="0.60" | 600 m || 
|-id=359 bgcolor=#fefefe
| 420359 ||  || — || February 27, 2009 || Kitt Peak || Spacewatch || — || align=right data-sort-value="0.57" | 570 m || 
|-id=360 bgcolor=#fefefe
| 420360 ||  || — || September 17, 2010 || Mount Lemmon || Mount Lemmon Survey || — || align=right data-sort-value="0.74" | 740 m || 
|-id=361 bgcolor=#fefefe
| 420361 ||  || — || September 13, 2007 || Mount Lemmon || Mount Lemmon Survey || — || align=right data-sort-value="0.55" | 550 m || 
|-id=362 bgcolor=#E9E9E9
| 420362 ||  || — || December 13, 2006 || Kitt Peak || Spacewatch || — || align=right | 2.6 km || 
|-id=363 bgcolor=#E9E9E9
| 420363 ||  || — || January 10, 2008 || Mount Lemmon || Mount Lemmon Survey || — || align=right | 1.1 km || 
|-id=364 bgcolor=#d6d6d6
| 420364 ||  || — || July 2, 2008 || Mount Lemmon || Mount Lemmon Survey || — || align=right | 3.9 km || 
|-id=365 bgcolor=#fefefe
| 420365 ||  || — || January 11, 2008 || Kitt Peak || Spacewatch || — || align=right data-sort-value="0.81" | 810 m || 
|-id=366 bgcolor=#fefefe
| 420366 ||  || — || March 16, 2005 || Catalina || CSS || V || align=right data-sort-value="0.91" | 910 m || 
|-id=367 bgcolor=#fefefe
| 420367 ||  || — || April 2, 2009 || Mount Lemmon || Mount Lemmon Survey || — || align=right data-sort-value="0.89" | 890 m || 
|-id=368 bgcolor=#fefefe
| 420368 ||  || — || March 9, 2005 || Socorro || LINEAR || — || align=right data-sort-value="0.74" | 740 m || 
|-id=369 bgcolor=#fefefe
| 420369 ||  || — || December 10, 2004 || Kitt Peak || Spacewatch || — || align=right data-sort-value="0.71" | 710 m || 
|-id=370 bgcolor=#fefefe
| 420370 ||  || — || September 9, 2007 || Kitt Peak || Spacewatch || — || align=right data-sort-value="0.79" | 790 m || 
|-id=371 bgcolor=#fefefe
| 420371 ||  || — || October 7, 2007 || Mount Lemmon || Mount Lemmon Survey || — || align=right data-sort-value="0.55" | 550 m || 
|-id=372 bgcolor=#fefefe
| 420372 ||  || — || November 7, 2007 || Kitt Peak || Spacewatch || — || align=right data-sort-value="0.80" | 800 m || 
|-id=373 bgcolor=#fefefe
| 420373 ||  || — || January 9, 2005 || Campo Imperatore || CINEOS || — || align=right data-sort-value="0.79" | 790 m || 
|-id=374 bgcolor=#fefefe
| 420374 ||  || — || October 31, 2007 || Mount Lemmon || Mount Lemmon Survey || — || align=right data-sort-value="0.60" | 600 m || 
|-id=375 bgcolor=#fefefe
| 420375 ||  || — || October 13, 2007 || Kitt Peak || Spacewatch || — || align=right data-sort-value="0.68" | 680 m || 
|-id=376 bgcolor=#fefefe
| 420376 ||  || — || March 16, 2002 || Kitt Peak || Spacewatch || — || align=right data-sort-value="0.92" | 920 m || 
|-id=377 bgcolor=#fefefe
| 420377 ||  || — || October 30, 1999 || Kitt Peak || Spacewatch || — || align=right | 1.0 km || 
|-id=378 bgcolor=#fefefe
| 420378 ||  || — || September 27, 2003 || Kitt Peak || Spacewatch || V || align=right data-sort-value="0.71" | 710 m || 
|-id=379 bgcolor=#fefefe
| 420379 ||  || — || November 4, 2007 || Kitt Peak || Spacewatch || — || align=right data-sort-value="0.65" | 650 m || 
|-id=380 bgcolor=#fefefe
| 420380 ||  || — || October 12, 1994 || Kitt Peak || Spacewatch || — || align=right data-sort-value="0.67" | 670 m || 
|-id=381 bgcolor=#fefefe
| 420381 ||  || — || November 24, 2008 || Catalina || CSS || H || align=right data-sort-value="0.59" | 590 m || 
|-id=382 bgcolor=#fefefe
| 420382 ||  || — || November 11, 2007 || Mount Lemmon || Mount Lemmon Survey || V || align=right data-sort-value="0.70" | 700 m || 
|-id=383 bgcolor=#fefefe
| 420383 ||  || — || October 7, 2007 || Kitt Peak || Spacewatch || (2076) || align=right data-sort-value="0.83" | 830 m || 
|-id=384 bgcolor=#fefefe
| 420384 ||  || — || April 7, 2005 || Mount Lemmon || Mount Lemmon Survey || NYS || align=right data-sort-value="0.58" | 580 m || 
|-id=385 bgcolor=#fefefe
| 420385 ||  || — || August 28, 2003 || Palomar || NEAT || — || align=right data-sort-value="0.90" | 900 m || 
|-id=386 bgcolor=#fefefe
| 420386 ||  || — || October 21, 2003 || Kitt Peak || Spacewatch || — || align=right data-sort-value="0.73" | 730 m || 
|-id=387 bgcolor=#fefefe
| 420387 ||  || — || December 30, 2007 || Kitt Peak || Spacewatch || — || align=right data-sort-value="0.87" | 870 m || 
|-id=388 bgcolor=#E9E9E9
| 420388 ||  || — || February 12, 2000 || Apache Point || SDSS || EUN || align=right | 1.6 km || 
|-id=389 bgcolor=#E9E9E9
| 420389 ||  || — || March 1, 2008 || Kitt Peak || Spacewatch || ADE || align=right | 2.4 km || 
|-id=390 bgcolor=#fefefe
| 420390 ||  || — || May 16, 2009 || Kitt Peak || Spacewatch || — || align=right data-sort-value="0.67" | 670 m || 
|-id=391 bgcolor=#fefefe
| 420391 ||  || — || February 7, 2002 || Palomar || NEAT || — || align=right data-sort-value="0.97" | 970 m || 
|-id=392 bgcolor=#fefefe
| 420392 ||  || — || September 26, 2000 || Anderson Mesa || LONEOS || — || align=right data-sort-value="0.96" | 960 m || 
|-id=393 bgcolor=#E9E9E9
| 420393 ||  || — || March 6, 2008 || Catalina || CSS || — || align=right | 1.1 km || 
|-id=394 bgcolor=#fefefe
| 420394 ||  || — || December 4, 2007 || Mount Lemmon || Mount Lemmon Survey || V || align=right data-sort-value="0.69" | 690 m || 
|-id=395 bgcolor=#fefefe
| 420395 ||  || — || August 21, 2006 || Kitt Peak || Spacewatch || — || align=right data-sort-value="0.83" | 830 m || 
|-id=396 bgcolor=#E9E9E9
| 420396 ||  || — || January 10, 2008 || Kitt Peak || Spacewatch || — || align=right data-sort-value="0.97" | 970 m || 
|-id=397 bgcolor=#fefefe
| 420397 ||  || — || November 2, 2007 || Mount Lemmon || Mount Lemmon Survey || (2076) || align=right data-sort-value="0.64" | 640 m || 
|-id=398 bgcolor=#fefefe
| 420398 ||  || — || December 30, 2007 || Kitt Peak || Spacewatch || — || align=right data-sort-value="0.79" | 790 m || 
|-id=399 bgcolor=#fefefe
| 420399 ||  || — || January 10, 1997 || Kitt Peak || Spacewatch || NYS || align=right data-sort-value="0.67" | 670 m || 
|-id=400 bgcolor=#fefefe
| 420400 ||  || — || October 4, 2002 || Palomar || NEAT || — || align=right | 1.3 km || 
|}

420401–420500 

|-bgcolor=#fefefe
| 420401 ||  || — || August 18, 2006 || Kitt Peak || Spacewatch || — || align=right data-sort-value="0.95" | 950 m || 
|-id=402 bgcolor=#fefefe
| 420402 ||  || — || April 9, 2005 || Mount Lemmon || Mount Lemmon Survey || — || align=right data-sort-value="0.69" | 690 m || 
|-id=403 bgcolor=#E9E9E9
| 420403 ||  || — || January 12, 2008 || Mount Lemmon || Mount Lemmon Survey || — || align=right | 1.0 km || 
|-id=404 bgcolor=#E9E9E9
| 420404 ||  || — || March 7, 2008 || Mount Lemmon || Mount Lemmon Survey || — || align=right | 2.8 km || 
|-id=405 bgcolor=#fefefe
| 420405 ||  || — || November 7, 2007 || Kitt Peak || Spacewatch || — || align=right data-sort-value="0.66" | 660 m || 
|-id=406 bgcolor=#fefefe
| 420406 ||  || — || October 4, 2007 || Kitt Peak || Spacewatch || — || align=right data-sort-value="0.74" | 740 m || 
|-id=407 bgcolor=#d6d6d6
| 420407 ||  || — || March 16, 2007 || Mount Lemmon || Mount Lemmon Survey || EOS || align=right | 1.8 km || 
|-id=408 bgcolor=#fefefe
| 420408 ||  || — || March 8, 2005 || Mount Lemmon || Mount Lemmon Survey || MAS || align=right data-sort-value="0.67" | 670 m || 
|-id=409 bgcolor=#fefefe
| 420409 ||  || — || November 13, 2006 || Catalina || CSS || — || align=right | 1.3 km || 
|-id=410 bgcolor=#fefefe
| 420410 ||  || — || July 6, 2003 || Kitt Peak || Spacewatch || — || align=right data-sort-value="0.97" | 970 m || 
|-id=411 bgcolor=#fefefe
| 420411 ||  || — || May 16, 2005 || Palomar || NEAT || — || align=right data-sort-value="0.74" | 740 m || 
|-id=412 bgcolor=#fefefe
| 420412 ||  || — || March 12, 2005 || Socorro || LINEAR || — || align=right data-sort-value="0.76" | 760 m || 
|-id=413 bgcolor=#fefefe
| 420413 ||  || — || September 26, 2000 || Apache Point || SDSS || — || align=right data-sort-value="0.79" | 790 m || 
|-id=414 bgcolor=#fefefe
| 420414 ||  || — || September 21, 2003 || Kitt Peak || Spacewatch || — || align=right data-sort-value="0.69" | 690 m || 
|-id=415 bgcolor=#E9E9E9
| 420415 ||  || — || March 29, 2008 || Kitt Peak || Spacewatch || AGN || align=right | 1.3 km || 
|-id=416 bgcolor=#E9E9E9
| 420416 ||  || — || February 19, 2012 || Kitt Peak || Spacewatch || MRX || align=right | 1.1 km || 
|-id=417 bgcolor=#fefefe
| 420417 ||  || — || January 21, 2012 || Kitt Peak || Spacewatch || MAS || align=right data-sort-value="0.69" | 690 m || 
|-id=418 bgcolor=#fefefe
| 420418 ||  || — || October 30, 2010 || Mount Lemmon || Mount Lemmon Survey || V || align=right data-sort-value="0.75" | 750 m || 
|-id=419 bgcolor=#fefefe
| 420419 ||  || — || November 8, 2007 || Mount Lemmon || Mount Lemmon Survey || — || align=right data-sort-value="0.87" | 870 m || 
|-id=420 bgcolor=#fefefe
| 420420 ||  || — || October 9, 2010 || Mount Lemmon || Mount Lemmon Survey || — || align=right data-sort-value="0.75" | 750 m || 
|-id=421 bgcolor=#fefefe
| 420421 ||  || — || September 10, 2010 || Kitt Peak || Spacewatch || — || align=right data-sort-value="0.94" | 940 m || 
|-id=422 bgcolor=#fefefe
| 420422 ||  || — || December 27, 2011 || Mount Lemmon || Mount Lemmon Survey || — || align=right data-sort-value="0.98" | 980 m || 
|-id=423 bgcolor=#fefefe
| 420423 ||  || — || January 9, 1997 || Kitt Peak || Spacewatch || — || align=right data-sort-value="0.65" | 650 m || 
|-id=424 bgcolor=#fefefe
| 420424 ||  || — || November 7, 2007 || Kitt Peak || Spacewatch || — || align=right data-sort-value="0.63" | 630 m || 
|-id=425 bgcolor=#fefefe
| 420425 ||  || — || September 10, 2010 || Kitt Peak || Spacewatch || — || align=right data-sort-value="0.79" | 790 m || 
|-id=426 bgcolor=#fefefe
| 420426 ||  || — || April 11, 2005 || Kitt Peak || Spacewatch || — || align=right data-sort-value="0.57" | 570 m || 
|-id=427 bgcolor=#fefefe
| 420427 ||  || — || January 19, 2005 || Kitt Peak || Spacewatch || — || align=right data-sort-value="0.63" | 630 m || 
|-id=428 bgcolor=#fefefe
| 420428 ||  || — || February 21, 2012 || Kitt Peak || Spacewatch || — || align=right data-sort-value="0.86" | 860 m || 
|-id=429 bgcolor=#E9E9E9
| 420429 ||  || — || April 8, 2003 || Kitt Peak || Spacewatch || — || align=right | 2.1 km || 
|-id=430 bgcolor=#fefefe
| 420430 ||  || — || March 3, 2005 || Catalina || CSS || — || align=right data-sort-value="0.61" | 610 m || 
|-id=431 bgcolor=#fefefe
| 420431 ||  || — || March 10, 2005 || Mount Lemmon || Mount Lemmon Survey || — || align=right data-sort-value="0.87" | 870 m || 
|-id=432 bgcolor=#fefefe
| 420432 ||  || — || May 11, 2005 || Kitt Peak || Spacewatch || — || align=right data-sort-value="0.66" | 660 m || 
|-id=433 bgcolor=#fefefe
| 420433 ||  || — || March 11, 2005 || Kitt Peak || Spacewatch || — || align=right data-sort-value="0.69" | 690 m || 
|-id=434 bgcolor=#d6d6d6
| 420434 ||  || — || November 25, 2005 || Kitt Peak || Spacewatch || — || align=right | 2.3 km || 
|-id=435 bgcolor=#E9E9E9
| 420435 ||  || — || November 17, 2006 || Mount Lemmon || Mount Lemmon Survey || — || align=right | 1.3 km || 
|-id=436 bgcolor=#fefefe
| 420436 ||  || — || April 12, 2005 || Kitt Peak || Spacewatch || — || align=right data-sort-value="0.64" | 640 m || 
|-id=437 bgcolor=#fefefe
| 420437 ||  || — || October 2, 2006 || Mount Lemmon || Mount Lemmon Survey || NYS || align=right data-sort-value="0.73" | 730 m || 
|-id=438 bgcolor=#fefefe
| 420438 ||  || — || December 13, 2007 || Socorro || LINEAR || — || align=right data-sort-value="0.86" | 860 m || 
|-id=439 bgcolor=#fefefe
| 420439 ||  || — || November 8, 2007 || Socorro || LINEAR || — || align=right data-sort-value="0.82" | 820 m || 
|-id=440 bgcolor=#fefefe
| 420440 ||  || — || September 18, 2010 || Kitt Peak || Spacewatch || — || align=right data-sort-value="0.83" | 830 m || 
|-id=441 bgcolor=#E9E9E9
| 420441 ||  || — || February 28, 2008 || Kitt Peak || Spacewatch || — || align=right data-sort-value="0.95" | 950 m || 
|-id=442 bgcolor=#fefefe
| 420442 ||  || — || April 13, 2005 || Kitt Peak || Spacewatch || — || align=right data-sort-value="0.74" | 740 m || 
|-id=443 bgcolor=#fefefe
| 420443 ||  || — || February 25, 2012 || Catalina || CSS || — || align=right data-sort-value="0.89" | 890 m || 
|-id=444 bgcolor=#d6d6d6
| 420444 ||  || — || October 30, 2005 || Mount Lemmon || Mount Lemmon Survey || 615 || align=right | 1.7 km || 
|-id=445 bgcolor=#E9E9E9
| 420445 ||  || — || June 14, 2004 || Socorro || LINEAR || — || align=right | 2.9 km || 
|-id=446 bgcolor=#E9E9E9
| 420446 ||  || — || January 17, 2007 || Kitt Peak || Spacewatch || AGN || align=right | 1.3 km || 
|-id=447 bgcolor=#fefefe
| 420447 ||  || — || October 9, 2010 || Mount Lemmon || Mount Lemmon Survey || — || align=right data-sort-value="0.83" | 830 m || 
|-id=448 bgcolor=#fefefe
| 420448 ||  || — || September 19, 2006 || Kitt Peak || Spacewatch || (5026) || align=right data-sort-value="0.87" | 870 m || 
|-id=449 bgcolor=#fefefe
| 420449 ||  || — || April 10, 2005 || Mount Lemmon || Mount Lemmon Survey || — || align=right data-sort-value="0.63" | 630 m || 
|-id=450 bgcolor=#fefefe
| 420450 ||  || — || September 19, 2003 || Palomar || NEAT || — || align=right data-sort-value="0.81" | 810 m || 
|-id=451 bgcolor=#fefefe
| 420451 ||  || — || September 28, 2003 || Kitt Peak || Spacewatch || — || align=right data-sort-value="0.65" | 650 m || 
|-id=452 bgcolor=#fefefe
| 420452 ||  || — || September 17, 2010 || Kitt Peak || Spacewatch || — || align=right data-sort-value="0.91" | 910 m || 
|-id=453 bgcolor=#fefefe
| 420453 ||  || — || September 30, 2003 || Kitt Peak || Spacewatch || — || align=right data-sort-value="0.85" | 850 m || 
|-id=454 bgcolor=#fefefe
| 420454 ||  || — || November 17, 2007 || Mount Lemmon || Mount Lemmon Survey || — || align=right data-sort-value="0.67" | 670 m || 
|-id=455 bgcolor=#fefefe
| 420455 ||  || — || September 29, 2010 || Mount Lemmon || Mount Lemmon Survey || V || align=right data-sort-value="0.65" | 650 m || 
|-id=456 bgcolor=#fefefe
| 420456 ||  || — || February 20, 2012 || Haleakala || Pan-STARRS || — || align=right data-sort-value="0.92" | 920 m || 
|-id=457 bgcolor=#fefefe
| 420457 ||  || — || November 11, 2007 || Mount Lemmon || Mount Lemmon Survey || V || align=right data-sort-value="0.70" | 700 m || 
|-id=458 bgcolor=#fefefe
| 420458 ||  || — || September 17, 2010 || Mount Lemmon || Mount Lemmon Survey || — || align=right data-sort-value="0.84" | 840 m || 
|-id=459 bgcolor=#fefefe
| 420459 ||  || — || February 21, 2001 || Kitt Peak || Spacewatch || — || align=right data-sort-value="0.74" | 740 m || 
|-id=460 bgcolor=#E9E9E9
| 420460 ||  || — || October 1, 2005 || Anderson Mesa || LONEOS || MAR || align=right | 1.3 km || 
|-id=461 bgcolor=#fefefe
| 420461 ||  || — || October 17, 2003 || Kitt Peak || Spacewatch || V || align=right data-sort-value="0.63" | 630 m || 
|-id=462 bgcolor=#E9E9E9
| 420462 ||  || — || April 14, 2008 || Mount Lemmon || Mount Lemmon Survey || — || align=right | 1.2 km || 
|-id=463 bgcolor=#fefefe
| 420463 ||  || — || March 17, 2005 || Mount Lemmon || Mount Lemmon Survey || — || align=right | 3.8 km || 
|-id=464 bgcolor=#E9E9E9
| 420464 ||  || — || August 25, 2005 || Palomar || NEAT || MAR || align=right | 1.4 km || 
|-id=465 bgcolor=#fefefe
| 420465 ||  || — || February 22, 2001 || Kitt Peak || Spacewatch || — || align=right data-sort-value="0.76" | 760 m || 
|-id=466 bgcolor=#d6d6d6
| 420466 ||  || — || January 23, 2006 || Kitt Peak || Spacewatch || — || align=right | 3.2 km || 
|-id=467 bgcolor=#fefefe
| 420467 ||  || — || February 23, 2012 || Kitt Peak || Spacewatch || — || align=right data-sort-value="0.80" | 800 m || 
|-id=468 bgcolor=#fefefe
| 420468 ||  || — || December 5, 2007 || Mount Lemmon || Mount Lemmon Survey || — || align=right | 2.5 km || 
|-id=469 bgcolor=#fefefe
| 420469 ||  || — || March 7, 2005 || Socorro || LINEAR || — || align=right data-sort-value="0.73" | 730 m || 
|-id=470 bgcolor=#fefefe
| 420470 ||  || — || February 9, 2005 || Kitt Peak || Spacewatch || — || align=right data-sort-value="0.72" | 720 m || 
|-id=471 bgcolor=#E9E9E9
| 420471 ||  || — || January 10, 2007 || Kitt Peak || Spacewatch || — || align=right | 2.7 km || 
|-id=472 bgcolor=#fefefe
| 420472 ||  || — || December 31, 2007 || Mount Lemmon || Mount Lemmon Survey || — || align=right data-sort-value="0.71" | 710 m || 
|-id=473 bgcolor=#fefefe
| 420473 ||  || — || January 21, 2012 || Kitt Peak || Spacewatch || — || align=right data-sort-value="0.73" | 730 m || 
|-id=474 bgcolor=#fefefe
| 420474 ||  || — || October 8, 2010 || Kitt Peak || Spacewatch || — || align=right data-sort-value="0.70" | 700 m || 
|-id=475 bgcolor=#fefefe
| 420475 ||  || — || April 17, 2005 || Catalina || CSS || — || align=right | 1.3 km || 
|-id=476 bgcolor=#fefefe
| 420476 ||  || — || April 4, 2005 || Mount Lemmon || Mount Lemmon Survey || — || align=right data-sort-value="0.71" | 710 m || 
|-id=477 bgcolor=#E9E9E9
| 420477 ||  || — || March 2, 2008 || Kitt Peak || Spacewatch || — || align=right | 1.3 km || 
|-id=478 bgcolor=#E9E9E9
| 420478 ||  || — || August 14, 2001 || Oukaïmeden || NEAT || — || align=right | 1.2 km || 
|-id=479 bgcolor=#fefefe
| 420479 ||  || — || March 11, 2005 || Mount Lemmon || Mount Lemmon Survey || — || align=right data-sort-value="0.67" | 670 m || 
|-id=480 bgcolor=#fefefe
| 420480 ||  || — || November 2, 2007 || Mount Lemmon || Mount Lemmon Survey || — || align=right data-sort-value="0.64" | 640 m || 
|-id=481 bgcolor=#fefefe
| 420481 ||  || — || October 28, 2010 || Catalina || CSS || — || align=right data-sort-value="0.95" | 950 m || 
|-id=482 bgcolor=#fefefe
| 420482 ||  || — || September 25, 2006 || Mount Lemmon || Mount Lemmon Survey || — || align=right data-sort-value="0.73" | 730 m || 
|-id=483 bgcolor=#fefefe
| 420483 ||  || — || September 19, 2006 || Kitt Peak || Spacewatch || MAS || align=right data-sort-value="0.84" | 840 m || 
|-id=484 bgcolor=#fefefe
| 420484 ||  || — || April 1, 2005 || Kitt Peak || Spacewatch || — || align=right data-sort-value="0.68" | 680 m || 
|-id=485 bgcolor=#E9E9E9
| 420485 ||  || — || November 23, 2006 || Kitt Peak || Spacewatch || — || align=right | 1.7 km || 
|-id=486 bgcolor=#fefefe
| 420486 ||  || — || December 1, 2003 || Kitt Peak || Spacewatch || — || align=right data-sort-value="0.71" | 710 m || 
|-id=487 bgcolor=#E9E9E9
| 420487 ||  || — || November 16, 2006 || Mount Lemmon || Mount Lemmon Survey || — || align=right | 1.8 km || 
|-id=488 bgcolor=#fefefe
| 420488 ||  || — || January 11, 2008 || Kitt Peak || Spacewatch || — || align=right data-sort-value="0.90" | 900 m || 
|-id=489 bgcolor=#fefefe
| 420489 ||  || — || December 16, 2007 || Mount Lemmon || Mount Lemmon Survey || V || align=right data-sort-value="0.62" | 620 m || 
|-id=490 bgcolor=#fefefe
| 420490 ||  || — || September 18, 2003 || Palomar || NEAT || — || align=right data-sort-value="0.92" | 920 m || 
|-id=491 bgcolor=#fefefe
| 420491 ||  || — || December 18, 2007 || Mount Lemmon || Mount Lemmon Survey || — || align=right data-sort-value="0.79" | 790 m || 
|-id=492 bgcolor=#fefefe
| 420492 ||  || — || April 5, 2005 || Mount Lemmon || Mount Lemmon Survey || — || align=right data-sort-value="0.61" | 610 m || 
|-id=493 bgcolor=#E9E9E9
| 420493 ||  || — || January 12, 2011 || Mount Lemmon || Mount Lemmon Survey || — || align=right | 2.4 km || 
|-id=494 bgcolor=#E9E9E9
| 420494 ||  || — || March 31, 2003 || Kitt Peak || Spacewatch || — || align=right | 2.3 km || 
|-id=495 bgcolor=#E9E9E9
| 420495 ||  || — || October 28, 2005 || Mount Lemmon || Mount Lemmon Survey || — || align=right | 2.8 km || 
|-id=496 bgcolor=#d6d6d6
| 420496 ||  || — || October 2, 2003 || Kitt Peak || Spacewatch || — || align=right | 4.1 km || 
|-id=497 bgcolor=#E9E9E9
| 420497 ||  || — || August 16, 2004 || Piszkéstető || NEAT || — || align=right | 2.4 km || 
|-id=498 bgcolor=#d6d6d6
| 420498 ||  || — || August 23, 2003 || Palomar || NEAT || EOS || align=right | 2.5 km || 
|-id=499 bgcolor=#fefefe
| 420499 ||  || — || February 16, 2001 || Cima Ekar || ADAS || — || align=right data-sort-value="0.72" | 720 m || 
|-id=500 bgcolor=#E9E9E9
| 420500 ||  || — || September 15, 2009 || Kitt Peak || Spacewatch || GEF || align=right | 1.6 km || 
|}

420501–420600 

|-bgcolor=#fefefe
| 420501 ||  || — || September 26, 2006 || Mount Lemmon || Mount Lemmon Survey || V || align=right data-sort-value="0.84" | 840 m || 
|-id=502 bgcolor=#d6d6d6
| 420502 ||  || — || October 12, 2009 || Mount Lemmon || Mount Lemmon Survey || — || align=right | 4.4 km || 
|-id=503 bgcolor=#E9E9E9
| 420503 ||  || — || December 21, 2006 || Kitt Peak || Spacewatch || MIS || align=right | 2.7 km || 
|-id=504 bgcolor=#E9E9E9
| 420504 ||  || — || March 11, 2008 || Kitt Peak || Spacewatch || — || align=right data-sort-value="0.92" | 920 m || 
|-id=505 bgcolor=#E9E9E9
| 420505 ||  || — || October 6, 2005 || Kitt Peak || Spacewatch || — || align=right | 1.7 km || 
|-id=506 bgcolor=#d6d6d6
| 420506 ||  || — || February 1, 2006 || Kitt Peak || Spacewatch || — || align=right | 2.9 km || 
|-id=507 bgcolor=#E9E9E9
| 420507 ||  || — || April 6, 2008 || Kitt Peak || Spacewatch || — || align=right | 1.5 km || 
|-id=508 bgcolor=#E9E9E9
| 420508 ||  || — || December 4, 2002 || Kitt Peak || M. W. Buie || — || align=right | 1.0 km || 
|-id=509 bgcolor=#E9E9E9
| 420509 ||  || — || February 27, 2008 || Mount Lemmon || Mount Lemmon Survey || — || align=right | 2.8 km || 
|-id=510 bgcolor=#E9E9E9
| 420510 ||  || — || September 30, 2009 || Mount Lemmon || Mount Lemmon Survey || GEF || align=right | 1.4 km || 
|-id=511 bgcolor=#fefefe
| 420511 ||  || — || December 18, 2007 || Mount Lemmon || Mount Lemmon Survey || — || align=right data-sort-value="0.94" | 940 m || 
|-id=512 bgcolor=#fefefe
| 420512 ||  || — || February 24, 2008 || Mount Lemmon || Mount Lemmon Survey || — || align=right data-sort-value="0.68" | 680 m || 
|-id=513 bgcolor=#fefefe
| 420513 ||  || — || November 3, 2007 || Mount Lemmon || Mount Lemmon Survey || — || align=right data-sort-value="0.72" | 720 m || 
|-id=514 bgcolor=#fefefe
| 420514 ||  || — || March 16, 2005 || Catalina || CSS || — || align=right data-sort-value="0.99" | 990 m || 
|-id=515 bgcolor=#E9E9E9
| 420515 ||  || — || May 10, 2003 || Kitt Peak || Spacewatch || — || align=right | 3.2 km || 
|-id=516 bgcolor=#E9E9E9
| 420516 ||  || — || August 30, 2005 || Kitt Peak || Spacewatch || — || align=right | 1.3 km || 
|-id=517 bgcolor=#E9E9E9
| 420517 ||  || — || May 3, 2008 || Kitt Peak || Spacewatch || — || align=right | 1.9 km || 
|-id=518 bgcolor=#fefefe
| 420518 ||  || — || December 18, 2007 || Mount Lemmon || Mount Lemmon Survey || NYS || align=right data-sort-value="0.61" | 610 m || 
|-id=519 bgcolor=#fefefe
| 420519 ||  || — || January 19, 2008 || Mount Lemmon || Mount Lemmon Survey || — || align=right data-sort-value="0.67" | 670 m || 
|-id=520 bgcolor=#E9E9E9
| 420520 ||  || — || August 28, 2009 || Kitt Peak || Spacewatch || — || align=right | 2.2 km || 
|-id=521 bgcolor=#fefefe
| 420521 ||  || — || December 19, 2007 || Mount Lemmon || Mount Lemmon Survey || V || align=right data-sort-value="0.67" | 670 m || 
|-id=522 bgcolor=#E9E9E9
| 420522 ||  || — || March 24, 2012 || Catalina || CSS || — || align=right | 1.8 km || 
|-id=523 bgcolor=#fefefe
| 420523 ||  || — || October 27, 2003 || Kitt Peak || Spacewatch || — || align=right data-sort-value="0.79" | 790 m || 
|-id=524 bgcolor=#E9E9E9
| 420524 ||  || — || January 10, 2007 || Kitt Peak || Spacewatch || — || align=right | 2.5 km || 
|-id=525 bgcolor=#E9E9E9
| 420525 ||  || — || March 26, 2012 || Mount Lemmon || Mount Lemmon Survey || — || align=right | 3.3 km || 
|-id=526 bgcolor=#E9E9E9
| 420526 ||  || — || April 16, 2004 || Kitt Peak || Spacewatch || — || align=right data-sort-value="0.80" | 800 m || 
|-id=527 bgcolor=#fefefe
| 420527 ||  || — || December 30, 2007 || Kitt Peak || Spacewatch || NYS || align=right data-sort-value="0.50" | 500 m || 
|-id=528 bgcolor=#E9E9E9
| 420528 ||  || — || December 5, 2010 || Mount Lemmon || Mount Lemmon Survey || — || align=right | 1.1 km || 
|-id=529 bgcolor=#E9E9E9
| 420529 ||  || — || February 18, 2008 || Mount Lemmon || Mount Lemmon Survey || — || align=right | 1.0 km || 
|-id=530 bgcolor=#E9E9E9
| 420530 ||  || — || December 9, 2010 || Mount Lemmon || Mount Lemmon Survey || — || align=right | 2.8 km || 
|-id=531 bgcolor=#d6d6d6
| 420531 ||  || — || January 26, 2011 || Mount Lemmon || Mount Lemmon Survey || — || align=right | 2.7 km || 
|-id=532 bgcolor=#E9E9E9
| 420532 ||  || — || October 28, 2005 || Mount Lemmon || Mount Lemmon Survey || — || align=right | 2.0 km || 
|-id=533 bgcolor=#fefefe
| 420533 ||  || — || April 2, 2002 || Eskridge || G. Hug || — || align=right data-sort-value="0.82" | 820 m || 
|-id=534 bgcolor=#fefefe
| 420534 ||  || — || December 3, 2007 || Kitt Peak || Spacewatch || — || align=right data-sort-value="0.68" | 680 m || 
|-id=535 bgcolor=#E9E9E9
| 420535 ||  || — || March 15, 2008 || Mount Lemmon || Mount Lemmon Survey || — || align=right | 1.9 km || 
|-id=536 bgcolor=#fefefe
| 420536 ||  || — || September 15, 2010 || Mount Lemmon || Mount Lemmon Survey || — || align=right data-sort-value="0.81" | 810 m || 
|-id=537 bgcolor=#d6d6d6
| 420537 ||  || — || September 27, 2009 || Catalina || CSS || — || align=right | 4.1 km || 
|-id=538 bgcolor=#E9E9E9
| 420538 ||  || — || October 6, 2005 || Mount Lemmon || Mount Lemmon Survey || — || align=right | 1.1 km || 
|-id=539 bgcolor=#E9E9E9
| 420539 ||  || — || March 16, 2012 || Kitt Peak || Spacewatch || — || align=right | 2.9 km || 
|-id=540 bgcolor=#E9E9E9
| 420540 ||  || — || November 16, 2010 || Mount Lemmon || Mount Lemmon Survey || — || align=right | 1.2 km || 
|-id=541 bgcolor=#E9E9E9
| 420541 ||  || — || September 11, 2010 || Mount Lemmon || Mount Lemmon Survey || — || align=right | 2.1 km || 
|-id=542 bgcolor=#E9E9E9
| 420542 ||  || — || August 27, 2009 || Kitt Peak || Spacewatch || — || align=right | 1.4 km || 
|-id=543 bgcolor=#E9E9E9
| 420543 ||  || — || March 27, 2012 || Kitt Peak || Spacewatch || — || align=right | 1.6 km || 
|-id=544 bgcolor=#E9E9E9
| 420544 ||  || — || October 29, 2010 || Mount Lemmon || Mount Lemmon Survey || MAR || align=right | 1.2 km || 
|-id=545 bgcolor=#fefefe
| 420545 ||  || — || November 6, 2010 || Mount Lemmon || Mount Lemmon Survey || — || align=right | 1.1 km || 
|-id=546 bgcolor=#d6d6d6
| 420546 ||  || — || March 13, 2007 || Mount Lemmon || Mount Lemmon Survey || — || align=right | 3.1 km || 
|-id=547 bgcolor=#E9E9E9
| 420547 ||  || — || December 9, 2010 || Mount Lemmon || Mount Lemmon Survey || EUN || align=right | 1.4 km || 
|-id=548 bgcolor=#E9E9E9
| 420548 ||  || — || December 14, 2010 || Mount Lemmon || Mount Lemmon Survey || — || align=right | 2.6 km || 
|-id=549 bgcolor=#E9E9E9
| 420549 ||  || — || April 1, 2008 || Kitt Peak || Spacewatch || — || align=right | 1.1 km || 
|-id=550 bgcolor=#E9E9E9
| 420550 ||  || — || December 21, 2006 || Kitt Peak || Spacewatch || — || align=right | 2.0 km || 
|-id=551 bgcolor=#d6d6d6
| 420551 ||  || — || March 16, 2012 || Kitt Peak || Spacewatch || — || align=right | 3.2 km || 
|-id=552 bgcolor=#E9E9E9
| 420552 ||  || — || September 26, 2005 || Kitt Peak || Spacewatch || — || align=right | 2.2 km || 
|-id=553 bgcolor=#d6d6d6
| 420553 ||  || — || March 26, 2007 || Kitt Peak || Spacewatch || — || align=right | 2.1 km || 
|-id=554 bgcolor=#d6d6d6
| 420554 ||  || — || March 27, 2012 || Kitt Peak || Spacewatch || VER || align=right | 2.8 km || 
|-id=555 bgcolor=#E9E9E9
| 420555 ||  || — || February 23, 2007 || Mount Lemmon || Mount Lemmon Survey || — || align=right | 1.7 km || 
|-id=556 bgcolor=#E9E9E9
| 420556 ||  || — || January 29, 2003 || Apache Point || SDSS || — || align=right | 1.1 km || 
|-id=557 bgcolor=#d6d6d6
| 420557 ||  || — || September 21, 2009 || Mount Lemmon || Mount Lemmon Survey || — || align=right | 2.6 km || 
|-id=558 bgcolor=#d6d6d6
| 420558 ||  || — || September 28, 2003 || Socorro || LINEAR || — || align=right | 3.3 km || 
|-id=559 bgcolor=#E9E9E9
| 420559 ||  || — || January 27, 2007 || Kitt Peak || Spacewatch || MRX || align=right | 1.0 km || 
|-id=560 bgcolor=#fefefe
| 420560 ||  || — || October 18, 2006 || Kitt Peak || Spacewatch || — || align=right | 1.1 km || 
|-id=561 bgcolor=#E9E9E9
| 420561 ||  || — || April 11, 2007 || Kitt Peak || Spacewatch || — || align=right | 2.1 km || 
|-id=562 bgcolor=#fefefe
| 420562 ||  || — || February 16, 2004 || Kitt Peak || Spacewatch || V || align=right data-sort-value="0.74" | 740 m || 
|-id=563 bgcolor=#d6d6d6
| 420563 ||  || — || January 12, 2011 || Mount Lemmon || Mount Lemmon Survey || — || align=right | 3.1 km || 
|-id=564 bgcolor=#E9E9E9
| 420564 ||  || — || May 3, 2008 || Mount Lemmon || Mount Lemmon Survey || EUN || align=right | 1.2 km || 
|-id=565 bgcolor=#d6d6d6
| 420565 ||  || — || October 23, 2009 || Kitt Peak || Spacewatch || — || align=right | 3.4 km || 
|-id=566 bgcolor=#E9E9E9
| 420566 ||  || — || May 29, 2008 || Kitt Peak || Spacewatch || — || align=right | 1.3 km || 
|-id=567 bgcolor=#E9E9E9
| 420567 ||  || — || April 9, 2003 || Kitt Peak || Spacewatch || — || align=right | 2.1 km || 
|-id=568 bgcolor=#d6d6d6
| 420568 ||  || — || October 5, 2002 || Palomar || NEAT || — || align=right | 3.9 km || 
|-id=569 bgcolor=#E9E9E9
| 420569 ||  || — || December 11, 2010 || Kitt Peak || Spacewatch || — || align=right | 2.5 km || 
|-id=570 bgcolor=#E9E9E9
| 420570 ||  || — || October 22, 2005 || Kitt Peak || Spacewatch || — || align=right | 2.6 km || 
|-id=571 bgcolor=#fefefe
| 420571 ||  || — || July 29, 2009 || Kitt Peak || Spacewatch || — || align=right | 1.0 km || 
|-id=572 bgcolor=#fefefe
| 420572 ||  || — || April 3, 1998 || Kitt Peak || Spacewatch || — || align=right data-sort-value="0.88" | 880 m || 
|-id=573 bgcolor=#d6d6d6
| 420573 ||  || — || October 14, 2009 || Mount Lemmon || Mount Lemmon Survey || — || align=right | 3.5 km || 
|-id=574 bgcolor=#E9E9E9
| 420574 ||  || — || May 28, 2008 || Kitt Peak || Spacewatch || EUN || align=right data-sort-value="0.85" | 850 m || 
|-id=575 bgcolor=#d6d6d6
| 420575 ||  || — || June 7, 2007 || Kitt Peak || Spacewatch || — || align=right | 4.6 km || 
|-id=576 bgcolor=#d6d6d6
| 420576 ||  || — || March 25, 2007 || Mount Lemmon || Mount Lemmon Survey || — || align=right | 2.9 km || 
|-id=577 bgcolor=#FA8072
| 420577 ||  || — || March 14, 2005 || Siding Spring || SSS || — || align=right data-sort-value="0.94" | 940 m || 
|-id=578 bgcolor=#fefefe
| 420578 ||  || — || April 14, 2001 || Socorro || LINEAR || — || align=right | 1.1 km || 
|-id=579 bgcolor=#E9E9E9
| 420579 ||  || — || November 8, 2010 || Kitt Peak || Spacewatch || EUN || align=right | 1.2 km || 
|-id=580 bgcolor=#fefefe
| 420580 ||  || — || February 7, 2008 || Kitt Peak || Spacewatch || — || align=right data-sort-value="0.86" | 860 m || 
|-id=581 bgcolor=#E9E9E9
| 420581 ||  || — || May 8, 2008 || Mount Lemmon || Mount Lemmon Survey || — || align=right | 1.6 km || 
|-id=582 bgcolor=#E9E9E9
| 420582 ||  || — || January 26, 2003 || Kitt Peak || Spacewatch || — || align=right | 1.7 km || 
|-id=583 bgcolor=#E9E9E9
| 420583 ||  || — || November 5, 2010 || Mount Lemmon || Mount Lemmon Survey || — || align=right | 1.7 km || 
|-id=584 bgcolor=#fefefe
| 420584 ||  || — || February 6, 2008 || Catalina || CSS || — || align=right data-sort-value="0.85" | 850 m || 
|-id=585 bgcolor=#E9E9E9
| 420585 ||  || — || April 14, 2008 || Kitt Peak || Spacewatch || — || align=right data-sort-value="0.81" | 810 m || 
|-id=586 bgcolor=#d6d6d6
| 420586 ||  || — || September 22, 2009 || Mount Lemmon || Mount Lemmon Survey || — || align=right | 4.3 km || 
|-id=587 bgcolor=#d6d6d6
| 420587 ||  || — || May 24, 2007 || Mount Lemmon || Mount Lemmon Survey || — || align=right | 2.9 km || 
|-id=588 bgcolor=#d6d6d6
| 420588 ||  || — || April 20, 2012 || Kitt Peak || Spacewatch || HYG || align=right | 2.8 km || 
|-id=589 bgcolor=#E9E9E9
| 420589 ||  || — || December 21, 2006 || Kitt Peak || L. H. Wasserman || — || align=right | 1.4 km || 
|-id=590 bgcolor=#E9E9E9
| 420590 ||  || — || November 10, 2005 || Mount Lemmon || Mount Lemmon Survey || — || align=right | 2.5 km || 
|-id=591 bgcolor=#FFC2E0
| 420591 ||  || — || April 24, 2012 || Haleakala || Pan-STARRS || APO || align=right data-sort-value="0.44" | 440 m || 
|-id=592 bgcolor=#d6d6d6
| 420592 ||  || — || January 25, 2011 || Mount Lemmon || Mount Lemmon Survey || — || align=right | 3.2 km || 
|-id=593 bgcolor=#d6d6d6
| 420593 ||  || — || October 23, 2003 || Apache Point || SDSS || — || align=right | 2.9 km || 
|-id=594 bgcolor=#E9E9E9
| 420594 ||  || — || March 24, 2012 || Kitt Peak || Spacewatch || KON || align=right | 3.5 km || 
|-id=595 bgcolor=#E9E9E9
| 420595 ||  || — || September 21, 2009 || Kitt Peak || Spacewatch || — || align=right | 1.9 km || 
|-id=596 bgcolor=#E9E9E9
| 420596 ||  || — || February 4, 1995 || Kitt Peak || Spacewatch || — || align=right | 1.4 km || 
|-id=597 bgcolor=#E9E9E9
| 420597 ||  || — || February 6, 2003 || Sandlot || NEAT || — || align=right | 2.3 km || 
|-id=598 bgcolor=#E9E9E9
| 420598 ||  || — || October 7, 2005 || Kitt Peak || Spacewatch || — || align=right data-sort-value="0.99" | 990 m || 
|-id=599 bgcolor=#E9E9E9
| 420599 ||  || — || October 11, 2009 || Mount Lemmon || Mount Lemmon Survey || — || align=right | 2.6 km || 
|-id=600 bgcolor=#d6d6d6
| 420600 ||  || — || January 6, 2010 || Mount Lemmon || Mount Lemmon Survey || VER || align=right | 3.1 km || 
|}

420601–420700 

|-bgcolor=#d6d6d6
| 420601 ||  || — || April 25, 2001 || Anderson Mesa || LONEOS || — || align=right | 3.7 km || 
|-id=602 bgcolor=#fefefe
| 420602 ||  || — || January 27, 2000 || Kitt Peak || Spacewatch || — || align=right | 1.0 km || 
|-id=603 bgcolor=#E9E9E9
| 420603 ||  || — || January 24, 2011 || Mount Lemmon || Mount Lemmon Survey || — || align=right | 2.4 km || 
|-id=604 bgcolor=#d6d6d6
| 420604 ||  || — || November 19, 2009 || Kitt Peak || Spacewatch || EOS || align=right | 1.7 km || 
|-id=605 bgcolor=#d6d6d6
| 420605 ||  || — || December 20, 2004 || Mount Lemmon || Mount Lemmon Survey || — || align=right | 3.0 km || 
|-id=606 bgcolor=#E9E9E9
| 420606 ||  || — || May 5, 2008 || Mount Lemmon || Mount Lemmon Survey || — || align=right | 1.5 km || 
|-id=607 bgcolor=#E9E9E9
| 420607 ||  || — || February 25, 2007 || Mount Lemmon || Mount Lemmon Survey || — || align=right | 2.5 km || 
|-id=608 bgcolor=#E9E9E9
| 420608 ||  || — || December 23, 2006 || Mount Lemmon || Mount Lemmon Survey || BRG || align=right | 1.5 km || 
|-id=609 bgcolor=#E9E9E9
| 420609 ||  || — || September 19, 2001 || Socorro || LINEAR || — || align=right | 1.6 km || 
|-id=610 bgcolor=#d6d6d6
| 420610 ||  || — || April 18, 2012 || Kitt Peak || Spacewatch || — || align=right | 3.6 km || 
|-id=611 bgcolor=#E9E9E9
| 420611 ||  || — || April 18, 2012 || Kitt Peak || Spacewatch || — || align=right | 1.6 km || 
|-id=612 bgcolor=#fefefe
| 420612 Nuptel ||  ||  || February 6, 2008 || XuYi || PMO NEO || — || align=right | 1.1 km || 
|-id=613 bgcolor=#d6d6d6
| 420613 ||  || — || March 26, 2010 || WISE || WISE || — || align=right | 3.9 km || 
|-id=614 bgcolor=#d6d6d6
| 420614 ||  || — || March 28, 1995 || Kitt Peak || Spacewatch || VER || align=right | 3.3 km || 
|-id=615 bgcolor=#fefefe
| 420615 ||  || — || March 27, 2008 || Kitt Peak || Spacewatch || — || align=right data-sort-value="0.98" | 980 m || 
|-id=616 bgcolor=#d6d6d6
| 420616 ||  || — || October 11, 2004 || Kitt Peak || Spacewatch || KOR || align=right | 1.3 km || 
|-id=617 bgcolor=#fefefe
| 420617 ||  || — || October 21, 2006 || Mount Lemmon || Mount Lemmon Survey || — || align=right data-sort-value="0.90" | 900 m || 
|-id=618 bgcolor=#E9E9E9
| 420618 ||  || — || November 27, 2010 || Mount Lemmon || Mount Lemmon Survey || — || align=right | 1.3 km || 
|-id=619 bgcolor=#fefefe
| 420619 ||  || — || January 30, 2008 || Kitt Peak || Spacewatch || — || align=right data-sort-value="0.80" | 800 m || 
|-id=620 bgcolor=#E9E9E9
| 420620 ||  || — || May 28, 2003 || Kitt Peak || Spacewatch || — || align=right | 2.0 km || 
|-id=621 bgcolor=#E9E9E9
| 420621 ||  || — || April 27, 2003 || Anderson Mesa || LONEOS || — || align=right | 4.3 km || 
|-id=622 bgcolor=#E9E9E9
| 420622 ||  || — || December 27, 2006 || Kitt Peak || Spacewatch || — || align=right | 1.1 km || 
|-id=623 bgcolor=#d6d6d6
| 420623 ||  || — || May 9, 2006 || Mount Lemmon || Mount Lemmon Survey || 7:4 || align=right | 3.5 km || 
|-id=624 bgcolor=#d6d6d6
| 420624 ||  || — || March 29, 2012 || Mount Lemmon || Mount Lemmon Survey || — || align=right | 3.1 km || 
|-id=625 bgcolor=#d6d6d6
| 420625 ||  || — || April 22, 2007 || Kitt Peak || Spacewatch || TRE || align=right | 3.9 km || 
|-id=626 bgcolor=#d6d6d6
| 420626 ||  || — || March 4, 2010 || WISE || WISE || — || align=right | 3.6 km || 
|-id=627 bgcolor=#fefefe
| 420627 ||  || — || March 18, 2004 || Palomar || NEAT || — || align=right | 1.0 km || 
|-id=628 bgcolor=#d6d6d6
| 420628 ||  || — || May 9, 2006 || Mount Lemmon || Mount Lemmon Survey || 7:4 || align=right | 3.7 km || 
|-id=629 bgcolor=#E9E9E9
| 420629 ||  || — || December 3, 2005 || Kitt Peak || Spacewatch || — || align=right | 2.6 km || 
|-id=630 bgcolor=#d6d6d6
| 420630 ||  || — || September 7, 2008 || Mount Lemmon || Mount Lemmon Survey || — || align=right | 2.8 km || 
|-id=631 bgcolor=#d6d6d6
| 420631 ||  || — || September 17, 2009 || Mount Lemmon || Mount Lemmon Survey || — || align=right | 2.2 km || 
|-id=632 bgcolor=#E9E9E9
| 420632 ||  || — || December 14, 2006 || Palomar || NEAT || — || align=right | 1.5 km || 
|-id=633 bgcolor=#E9E9E9
| 420633 ||  || — || February 8, 2007 || Kitt Peak || Spacewatch || EUN || align=right | 1.6 km || 
|-id=634 bgcolor=#E9E9E9
| 420634 ||  || — || December 8, 2005 || Kitt Peak || Spacewatch || — || align=right | 2.8 km || 
|-id=635 bgcolor=#E9E9E9
| 420635 ||  || — || February 10, 2002 || Socorro || LINEAR || — || align=right | 2.8 km || 
|-id=636 bgcolor=#fefefe
| 420636 ||  || — || November 2, 2007 || Mount Lemmon || Mount Lemmon Survey || — || align=right data-sort-value="0.86" | 860 m || 
|-id=637 bgcolor=#d6d6d6
| 420637 ||  || — || October 7, 2008 || Mount Lemmon || Mount Lemmon Survey || — || align=right | 4.0 km || 
|-id=638 bgcolor=#E9E9E9
| 420638 ||  || — || March 13, 2003 || Kitt Peak || Spacewatch || — || align=right | 1.4 km || 
|-id=639 bgcolor=#fefefe
| 420639 ||  || — || December 16, 2007 || Catalina || CSS || — || align=right | 2.6 km || 
|-id=640 bgcolor=#E9E9E9
| 420640 ||  || — || April 20, 2012 || Kitt Peak || Spacewatch || — || align=right | 1.1 km || 
|-id=641 bgcolor=#E9E9E9
| 420641 ||  || — || January 10, 2007 || Kitt Peak || Spacewatch || — || align=right | 1.2 km || 
|-id=642 bgcolor=#fefefe
| 420642 ||  || — || March 17, 2004 || Socorro || LINEAR || — || align=right data-sort-value="0.98" | 980 m || 
|-id=643 bgcolor=#d6d6d6
| 420643 ||  || — || April 18, 2007 || Kitt Peak || Spacewatch || — || align=right | 2.2 km || 
|-id=644 bgcolor=#d6d6d6
| 420644 ||  || — || October 22, 2003 || Kitt Peak || Spacewatch || — || align=right | 2.8 km || 
|-id=645 bgcolor=#E9E9E9
| 420645 ||  || — || November 10, 2006 || Kitt Peak || Spacewatch || — || align=right | 1.2 km || 
|-id=646 bgcolor=#d6d6d6
| 420646 ||  || — || April 25, 2007 || Kitt Peak || Spacewatch || EOS || align=right | 2.2 km || 
|-id=647 bgcolor=#E9E9E9
| 420647 ||  || — || December 25, 2005 || Kitt Peak || Spacewatch || HOF || align=right | 2.6 km || 
|-id=648 bgcolor=#fefefe
| 420648 ||  || — || February 10, 2008 || Catalina || CSS || — || align=right data-sort-value="0.98" | 980 m || 
|-id=649 bgcolor=#d6d6d6
| 420649 ||  || — || October 2, 2008 || Kitt Peak || Spacewatch || — || align=right | 2.9 km || 
|-id=650 bgcolor=#E9E9E9
| 420650 ||  || — || March 16, 2007 || Kitt Peak || Spacewatch || — || align=right | 2.1 km || 
|-id=651 bgcolor=#E9E9E9
| 420651 ||  || — || November 1, 2000 || Kitt Peak || Spacewatch || — || align=right | 2.3 km || 
|-id=652 bgcolor=#E9E9E9
| 420652 ||  || — || November 14, 2006 || Mount Lemmon || Mount Lemmon Survey || — || align=right | 1.6 km || 
|-id=653 bgcolor=#E9E9E9
| 420653 ||  || — || January 31, 2003 || Socorro || LINEAR || — || align=right | 1.6 km || 
|-id=654 bgcolor=#fefefe
| 420654 ||  || — || May 12, 2012 || Mount Lemmon || Mount Lemmon Survey || — || align=right | 1.2 km || 
|-id=655 bgcolor=#E9E9E9
| 420655 ||  || — || November 24, 2006 || Mount Lemmon || Mount Lemmon Survey || — || align=right | 2.9 km || 
|-id=656 bgcolor=#fefefe
| 420656 ||  || — || November 18, 2007 || Kitt Peak || Spacewatch || — || align=right data-sort-value="0.92" | 920 m || 
|-id=657 bgcolor=#d6d6d6
| 420657 ||  || — || September 24, 2008 || Kitt Peak || Spacewatch || — || align=right | 2.8 km || 
|-id=658 bgcolor=#E9E9E9
| 420658 ||  || — || January 24, 2007 || Socorro || LINEAR || — || align=right | 1.1 km || 
|-id=659 bgcolor=#d6d6d6
| 420659 ||  || — || July 11, 2001 || Palomar || NEAT || Tj (2.98) || align=right | 4.7 km || 
|-id=660 bgcolor=#d6d6d6
| 420660 ||  || — || November 26, 2009 || Mount Lemmon || Mount Lemmon Survey || — || align=right | 5.6 km || 
|-id=661 bgcolor=#d6d6d6
| 420661 ||  || — || February 19, 2010 || WISE || WISE || — || align=right | 4.6 km || 
|-id=662 bgcolor=#E9E9E9
| 420662 ||  || — || September 22, 2009 || Kitt Peak || Spacewatch || — || align=right | 2.3 km || 
|-id=663 bgcolor=#d6d6d6
| 420663 ||  || — || January 23, 2006 || Kitt Peak || Spacewatch || KOR || align=right | 1.5 km || 
|-id=664 bgcolor=#E9E9E9
| 420664 ||  || — || September 18, 2009 || Kitt Peak || Spacewatch || — || align=right | 2.3 km || 
|-id=665 bgcolor=#E9E9E9
| 420665 ||  || — || May 1, 2003 || Kitt Peak || Spacewatch || — || align=right | 2.0 km || 
|-id=666 bgcolor=#E9E9E9
| 420666 ||  || — || January 7, 2006 || Mount Lemmon || Mount Lemmon Survey || — || align=right | 2.1 km || 
|-id=667 bgcolor=#E9E9E9
| 420667 ||  || — || March 10, 2007 || Kitt Peak || Spacewatch || — || align=right | 1.1 km || 
|-id=668 bgcolor=#d6d6d6
| 420668 ||  || — || February 25, 2011 || Mount Lemmon || Mount Lemmon Survey || — || align=right | 2.5 km || 
|-id=669 bgcolor=#d6d6d6
| 420669 ||  || — || May 14, 2007 || Mount Lemmon || Mount Lemmon Survey || EOS || align=right | 1.6 km || 
|-id=670 bgcolor=#E9E9E9
| 420670 ||  || — || December 14, 2001 || Socorro || LINEAR || — || align=right | 1.7 km || 
|-id=671 bgcolor=#d6d6d6
| 420671 ||  || — || March 24, 2006 || Kitt Peak || Spacewatch || THM || align=right | 2.9 km || 
|-id=672 bgcolor=#d6d6d6
| 420672 ||  || — || March 4, 2006 || Kitt Peak || Spacewatch || — || align=right | 2.8 km || 
|-id=673 bgcolor=#d6d6d6
| 420673 ||  || — || December 10, 2009 || Mount Lemmon || Mount Lemmon Survey || — || align=right | 3.2 km || 
|-id=674 bgcolor=#d6d6d6
| 420674 ||  || — || November 27, 2009 || Mount Lemmon || Mount Lemmon Survey || — || align=right | 4.3 km || 
|-id=675 bgcolor=#E9E9E9
| 420675 ||  || — || December 28, 2005 || Mount Lemmon || Mount Lemmon Survey || — || align=right | 2.1 km || 
|-id=676 bgcolor=#d6d6d6
| 420676 ||  || — || October 12, 2009 || Mount Lemmon || Mount Lemmon Survey || — || align=right | 2.8 km || 
|-id=677 bgcolor=#d6d6d6
| 420677 ||  || — || February 25, 2006 || Kitt Peak || Spacewatch || — || align=right | 2.6 km || 
|-id=678 bgcolor=#E9E9E9
| 420678 ||  || — || December 28, 2005 || Kitt Peak || Spacewatch || — || align=right | 1.8 km || 
|-id=679 bgcolor=#E9E9E9
| 420679 ||  || — || October 27, 2005 || Catalina || CSS || — || align=right | 1.6 km || 
|-id=680 bgcolor=#E9E9E9
| 420680 ||  || — || May 7, 2008 || Kitt Peak || Spacewatch || — || align=right | 1.8 km || 
|-id=681 bgcolor=#d6d6d6
| 420681 ||  || — || April 19, 2006 || Mount Lemmon || Mount Lemmon Survey || — || align=right | 2.9 km || 
|-id=682 bgcolor=#d6d6d6
| 420682 ||  || — || January 27, 2006 || Kitt Peak || Spacewatch || — || align=right | 2.4 km || 
|-id=683 bgcolor=#E9E9E9
| 420683 ||  || — || February 10, 2011 || Mount Lemmon || Mount Lemmon Survey || — || align=right | 3.5 km || 
|-id=684 bgcolor=#fefefe
| 420684 ||  || — || February 11, 2008 || Kitt Peak || Spacewatch || — || align=right data-sort-value="0.79" | 790 m || 
|-id=685 bgcolor=#d6d6d6
| 420685 ||  || — || September 23, 2008 || Kitt Peak || Spacewatch || — || align=right | 3.3 km || 
|-id=686 bgcolor=#E9E9E9
| 420686 ||  || — || October 29, 2005 || Mount Lemmon || Mount Lemmon Survey || — || align=right | 2.4 km || 
|-id=687 bgcolor=#d6d6d6
| 420687 ||  || — || December 10, 2009 || Mount Lemmon || Mount Lemmon Survey || — || align=right | 3.0 km || 
|-id=688 bgcolor=#E9E9E9
| 420688 ||  || — || November 3, 2005 || Catalina || CSS || — || align=right | 1.2 km || 
|-id=689 bgcolor=#d6d6d6
| 420689 ||  || — || December 3, 2004 || Kitt Peak || Spacewatch || — || align=right | 3.9 km || 
|-id=690 bgcolor=#E9E9E9
| 420690 ||  || — || May 1, 2003 || Kitt Peak || Spacewatch || — || align=right | 2.5 km || 
|-id=691 bgcolor=#d6d6d6
| 420691 ||  || — || March 26, 2007 || Mount Lemmon || Mount Lemmon Survey || KOR || align=right | 1.2 km || 
|-id=692 bgcolor=#E9E9E9
| 420692 ||  || — || August 22, 2004 || Kitt Peak || Spacewatch || — || align=right | 1.8 km || 
|-id=693 bgcolor=#d6d6d6
| 420693 ||  || — || October 7, 2008 || Mount Lemmon || Mount Lemmon Survey || — || align=right | 2.9 km || 
|-id=694 bgcolor=#d6d6d6
| 420694 ||  || — || October 20, 2003 || Kitt Peak || Spacewatch || — || align=right | 2.9 km || 
|-id=695 bgcolor=#d6d6d6
| 420695 ||  || — || September 16, 2003 || Kitt Peak || Spacewatch || — || align=right | 2.5 km || 
|-id=696 bgcolor=#E9E9E9
| 420696 ||  || — || February 25, 2007 || Mount Lemmon || Mount Lemmon Survey || — || align=right | 1.6 km || 
|-id=697 bgcolor=#E9E9E9
| 420697 ||  || — || October 26, 2009 || Kitt Peak || Spacewatch || AGN || align=right | 1.1 km || 
|-id=698 bgcolor=#d6d6d6
| 420698 ||  || — || January 1, 2009 || Mount Lemmon || Mount Lemmon Survey || Tj (2.99) || align=right | 4.6 km || 
|-id=699 bgcolor=#E9E9E9
| 420699 ||  || — || June 12, 2004 || Palomar || NEAT || — || align=right | 2.6 km || 
|-id=700 bgcolor=#E9E9E9
| 420700 ||  || — || February 2, 2010 || WISE || WISE || EUN || align=right | 1.3 km || 
|}

420701–420800 

|-bgcolor=#d6d6d6
| 420701 ||  || — || February 25, 2006 || Mount Lemmon || Mount Lemmon Survey || — || align=right | 3.5 km || 
|-id=702 bgcolor=#d6d6d6
| 420702 ||  || — || January 15, 2011 || Mount Lemmon || Mount Lemmon Survey || — || align=right | 3.0 km || 
|-id=703 bgcolor=#d6d6d6
| 420703 ||  || — || March 15, 2010 || WISE || WISE || — || align=right | 4.1 km || 
|-id=704 bgcolor=#d6d6d6
| 420704 ||  || — || March 9, 2011 || Mount Lemmon || Mount Lemmon Survey || — || align=right | 3.4 km || 
|-id=705 bgcolor=#E9E9E9
| 420705 ||  || — || January 28, 2007 || Catalina || CSS || — || align=right | 2.4 km || 
|-id=706 bgcolor=#d6d6d6
| 420706 ||  || — || December 2, 2010 || Mount Lemmon || Mount Lemmon Survey || — || align=right | 3.8 km || 
|-id=707 bgcolor=#d6d6d6
| 420707 ||  || — || February 10, 2011 || Mount Lemmon || Mount Lemmon Survey || THM || align=right | 2.8 km || 
|-id=708 bgcolor=#d6d6d6
| 420708 ||  || — || November 24, 2003 || Kitt Peak || Spacewatch || — || align=right | 3.9 km || 
|-id=709 bgcolor=#d6d6d6
| 420709 ||  || — || May 19, 2012 || Mount Lemmon || Mount Lemmon Survey || — || align=right | 2.6 km || 
|-id=710 bgcolor=#d6d6d6
| 420710 ||  || — || January 7, 2010 || Mount Lemmon || Mount Lemmon Survey || — || align=right | 3.4 km || 
|-id=711 bgcolor=#E9E9E9
| 420711 ||  || — || September 29, 2005 || Siding Spring || SSS || — || align=right | 1.5 km || 
|-id=712 bgcolor=#E9E9E9
| 420712 ||  || — || February 8, 2007 || Palomar || NEAT || — || align=right | 3.4 km || 
|-id=713 bgcolor=#d6d6d6
| 420713 ||  || — || September 23, 2008 || Mount Lemmon || Mount Lemmon Survey || — || align=right | 3.9 km || 
|-id=714 bgcolor=#d6d6d6
| 420714 ||  || — || April 21, 2012 || Mount Lemmon || Mount Lemmon Survey || — || align=right | 3.2 km || 
|-id=715 bgcolor=#C2FFFF
| 420715 ||  || — || June 9, 2011 || Mount Lemmon || Mount Lemmon Survey || L5 || align=right | 12 km || 
|-id=716 bgcolor=#C2FFFF
| 420716 ||  || — || March 5, 1994 || Kitt Peak || Spacewatch || L5 || align=right | 13 km || 
|-id=717 bgcolor=#d6d6d6
| 420717 ||  || — || February 3, 2009 || Mount Lemmon || Mount Lemmon Survey || 3:2 || align=right | 5.3 km || 
|-id=718 bgcolor=#d6d6d6
| 420718 ||  || — || December 21, 2003 || Kitt Peak || Spacewatch ||  || align=right | 4.4 km || 
|-id=719 bgcolor=#E9E9E9
| 420719 ||  || — || January 21, 2002 || Kitt Peak || Spacewatch || — || align=right | 2.3 km || 
|-id=720 bgcolor=#d6d6d6
| 420720 ||  || — || May 28, 2010 || WISE || WISE || VER || align=right | 3.2 km || 
|-id=721 bgcolor=#d6d6d6
| 420721 ||  || — || October 22, 2008 || Kitt Peak || Spacewatch || EOS || align=right | 2.5 km || 
|-id=722 bgcolor=#d6d6d6
| 420722 ||  || — || April 12, 2005 || Anderson Mesa || LONEOS || — || align=right | 3.7 km || 
|-id=723 bgcolor=#d6d6d6
| 420723 ||  || — || March 15, 2010 || Catalina || CSS || — || align=right | 3.5 km || 
|-id=724 bgcolor=#d6d6d6
| 420724 ||  || — || October 14, 2001 || Charleston || Spacewatch || — || align=right | 3.5 km || 
|-id=725 bgcolor=#d6d6d6
| 420725 ||  || — || March 13, 2010 || Catalina || CSS || — || align=right | 5.0 km || 
|-id=726 bgcolor=#C2FFFF
| 420726 ||  || — || June 27, 2011 || Kitt Peak || Spacewatch || L5 || align=right | 7.7 km || 
|-id=727 bgcolor=#C2FFFF
| 420727 ||  || — || April 14, 2008 || Mount Lemmon || Mount Lemmon Survey || L5 || align=right | 8.2 km || 
|-id=728 bgcolor=#C2FFFF
| 420728 ||  || — || July 26, 2011 || Haleakala || Pan-STARRS || L5 || align=right | 11 km || 
|-id=729 bgcolor=#fefefe
| 420729 ||  || — || August 3, 2008 || Siding Spring || SSS || — || align=right | 1.6 km || 
|-id=730 bgcolor=#d6d6d6
| 420730 ||  || — || October 15, 1996 || Kitt Peak || Spacewatch || EOS || align=right | 1.9 km || 
|-id=731 bgcolor=#C2FFFF
| 420731 ||  || — || March 15, 2007 || Kitt Peak || Spacewatch || L5 || align=right | 10 km || 
|-id=732 bgcolor=#d6d6d6
| 420732 ||  || — || March 15, 2004 || Kitt Peak || Spacewatch || — || align=right | 3.7 km || 
|-id=733 bgcolor=#d6d6d6
| 420733 ||  || — || January 12, 2010 || WISE || WISE || — || align=right | 4.2 km || 
|-id=734 bgcolor=#d6d6d6
| 420734 ||  || — || March 26, 2004 || Kitt Peak || Spacewatch || — || align=right | 3.2 km || 
|-id=735 bgcolor=#C2FFFF
| 420735 ||  || — || December 5, 2002 || Kitt Peak || Spacewatch || L5 || align=right | 8.3 km || 
|-id=736 bgcolor=#C2FFFF
| 420736 ||  || — || February 25, 2007 || Mount Lemmon || Mount Lemmon Survey || L5 || align=right | 8.4 km || 
|-id=737 bgcolor=#C2FFFF
| 420737 ||  || — || March 20, 2007 || Mount Lemmon || Mount Lemmon Survey || L5 || align=right | 8.3 km || 
|-id=738 bgcolor=#FFC2E0
| 420738 ||  || — || October 4, 2012 || Catalina || CSS || ATEcritical || align=right data-sort-value="0.25" | 250 m || 
|-id=739 bgcolor=#C2FFFF
| 420739 ||  || — || February 21, 2006 || Mount Lemmon || Mount Lemmon Survey || L5 || align=right | 8.5 km || 
|-id=740 bgcolor=#C2FFFF
| 420740 ||  || — || May 31, 2011 || Mount Lemmon || Mount Lemmon Survey || L5 || align=right | 8.1 km || 
|-id=741 bgcolor=#C2FFFF
| 420741 ||  || — || May 5, 2008 || Mount Lemmon || Mount Lemmon Survey || L5 || align=right | 8.0 km || 
|-id=742 bgcolor=#C2FFFF
| 420742 ||  || — || September 4, 2000 || Kitt Peak || Spacewatch || L5 || align=right | 7.3 km || 
|-id=743 bgcolor=#C2FFFF
| 420743 ||  || — || May 28, 2008 || Mount Lemmon || Mount Lemmon Survey || L5 || align=right | 8.4 km || 
|-id=744 bgcolor=#C2FFFF
| 420744 ||  || — || April 14, 2008 || Kitt Peak || Spacewatch || L5 || align=right | 8.0 km || 
|-id=745 bgcolor=#d6d6d6
| 420745 ||  || — || April 20, 2010 || Mount Lemmon || Mount Lemmon Survey || — || align=right | 4.4 km || 
|-id=746 bgcolor=#d6d6d6
| 420746 ||  || — || November 17, 2007 || Mount Lemmon || Mount Lemmon Survey || — || align=right | 6.7 km || 
|-id=747 bgcolor=#d6d6d6
| 420747 ||  || — || March 20, 1999 || Apache Point || SDSS || — || align=right | 3.1 km || 
|-id=748 bgcolor=#C2FFFF
| 420748 ||  || — || April 27, 2010 || WISE || WISE || L5 || align=right | 8.6 km || 
|-id=749 bgcolor=#C2FFFF
| 420749 ||  || — || September 18, 2012 || Mount Lemmon || Mount Lemmon Survey || L5 || align=right | 12 km || 
|-id=750 bgcolor=#fefefe
| 420750 ||  || — || October 27, 2008 || ESA OGS || Mount Lemmon Survey || — || align=right data-sort-value="0.75" | 750 m || 
|-id=751 bgcolor=#fefefe
| 420751 ||  || — || January 6, 2005 || Socorro || LINEAR || H || align=right data-sort-value="0.70" | 700 m || 
|-id=752 bgcolor=#C2FFFF
| 420752 ||  || — || November 6, 2010 || Catalina || CSS || L4 || align=right | 12 km || 
|-id=753 bgcolor=#C2FFFF
| 420753 ||  || — || June 26, 2007 || Kitt Peak || Spacewatch || L4 || align=right | 11 km || 
|-id=754 bgcolor=#fefefe
| 420754 ||  || — || December 10, 2004 || Socorro || LINEAR || H || align=right data-sort-value="0.94" | 940 m || 
|-id=755 bgcolor=#fefefe
| 420755 ||  || — || July 23, 2011 || Siding Spring || SSS || H || align=right | 1.1 km || 
|-id=756 bgcolor=#fefefe
| 420756 ||  || — || October 23, 2006 || Catalina || CSS || H || align=right data-sort-value="0.76" | 760 m || 
|-id=757 bgcolor=#fefefe
| 420757 ||  || — || June 10, 2010 || Mount Lemmon || Mount Lemmon Survey || — || align=right data-sort-value="0.75" | 750 m || 
|-id=758 bgcolor=#FA8072
| 420758 ||  || — || February 18, 2008 || Mount Lemmon || Mount Lemmon Survey || H || align=right data-sort-value="0.54" | 540 m || 
|-id=759 bgcolor=#fefefe
| 420759 ||  || — || June 11, 2004 || Kitt Peak || Spacewatch || — || align=right | 1.6 km || 
|-id=760 bgcolor=#fefefe
| 420760 ||  || — || August 20, 2003 || Campo Imperatore || CINEOS || H || align=right data-sort-value="0.55" | 550 m || 
|-id=761 bgcolor=#fefefe
| 420761 ||  || — || February 27, 2006 || Kitt Peak || Spacewatch || — || align=right | 1.0 km || 
|-id=762 bgcolor=#fefefe
| 420762 ||  || — || October 9, 2007 || Mount Lemmon || Mount Lemmon Survey || — || align=right data-sort-value="0.91" | 910 m || 
|-id=763 bgcolor=#E9E9E9
| 420763 ||  || — || April 6, 2005 || Catalina || CSS || (5) || align=right | 1.1 km || 
|-id=764 bgcolor=#E9E9E9
| 420764 ||  || — || January 13, 2008 || Kitt Peak || Spacewatch || — || align=right | 1.6 km || 
|-id=765 bgcolor=#fefefe
| 420765 ||  || — || September 13, 2004 || Anderson Mesa || LONEOS || — || align=right data-sort-value="0.82" | 820 m || 
|-id=766 bgcolor=#fefefe
| 420766 ||  || — || September 10, 2004 || Kitt Peak || Spacewatch || — || align=right data-sort-value="0.69" | 690 m || 
|-id=767 bgcolor=#FA8072
| 420767 ||  || — || May 10, 2003 || Kitt Peak || Spacewatch || H || align=right data-sort-value="0.54" | 540 m || 
|-id=768 bgcolor=#E9E9E9
| 420768 ||  || — || October 10, 2001 || Kitt Peak || Spacewatch || — || align=right | 1.5 km || 
|-id=769 bgcolor=#fefefe
| 420769 ||  || — || May 10, 2003 || Kitt Peak || Spacewatch || — || align=right data-sort-value="0.73" | 730 m || 
|-id=770 bgcolor=#fefefe
| 420770 ||  || — || September 13, 2007 || Kitt Peak || Spacewatch || — || align=right | 1.8 km || 
|-id=771 bgcolor=#fefefe
| 420771 ||  || — || April 29, 2000 || Socorro || LINEAR || — || align=right data-sort-value="0.78" | 780 m || 
|-id=772 bgcolor=#fefefe
| 420772 ||  || — || April 2, 2013 || Catalina || CSS || — || align=right data-sort-value="0.88" | 880 m || 
|-id=773 bgcolor=#fefefe
| 420773 ||  || — || December 31, 2008 || Mount Lemmon || Mount Lemmon Survey || — || align=right data-sort-value="0.74" | 740 m || 
|-id=774 bgcolor=#fefefe
| 420774 ||  || — || November 5, 2007 || Kitt Peak || Spacewatch || — || align=right data-sort-value="0.72" | 720 m || 
|-id=775 bgcolor=#fefefe
| 420775 ||  || — || January 16, 2005 || Kitt Peak || Spacewatch || — || align=right data-sort-value="0.94" | 940 m || 
|-id=776 bgcolor=#E9E9E9
| 420776 ||  || — || March 22, 2004 || Socorro || LINEAR || — || align=right | 1.6 km || 
|-id=777 bgcolor=#fefefe
| 420777 ||  || — || March 23, 2003 || Kitt Peak || Spacewatch || — || align=right data-sort-value="0.62" | 620 m || 
|-id=778 bgcolor=#fefefe
| 420778 ||  || — || January 28, 2006 || Mount Lemmon || Mount Lemmon Survey || — || align=right data-sort-value="0.80" | 800 m || 
|-id=779 bgcolor=#E9E9E9
| 420779 Świdwin ||  ||  || April 11, 2013 || ESA OGS || ESA OGS || — || align=right | 1.5 km || 
|-id=780 bgcolor=#fefefe
| 420780 ||  || — || August 10, 2007 || Kitt Peak || Spacewatch || — || align=right data-sort-value="0.74" | 740 m || 
|-id=781 bgcolor=#fefefe
| 420781 ||  || — || October 10, 2007 || Mount Lemmon || Mount Lemmon Survey || — || align=right data-sort-value="0.86" | 860 m || 
|-id=782 bgcolor=#fefefe
| 420782 ||  || — || December 11, 2004 || Kitt Peak || Spacewatch || — || align=right data-sort-value="0.86" | 860 m || 
|-id=783 bgcolor=#fefefe
| 420783 ||  || — || November 28, 2011 || Kitt Peak || Spacewatch || — || align=right data-sort-value="0.93" | 930 m || 
|-id=784 bgcolor=#E9E9E9
| 420784 ||  || — || May 13, 2005 || Kitt Peak || Spacewatch || — || align=right | 1.0 km || 
|-id=785 bgcolor=#E9E9E9
| 420785 ||  || — || November 23, 2006 || Kitt Peak || Spacewatch || JUN || align=right | 1.0 km || 
|-id=786 bgcolor=#fefefe
| 420786 ||  || — || January 1, 2009 || Kitt Peak || Spacewatch || — || align=right data-sort-value="0.90" | 900 m || 
|-id=787 bgcolor=#d6d6d6
| 420787 ||  || — || September 17, 2009 || Kitt Peak || Spacewatch || — || align=right | 2.9 km || 
|-id=788 bgcolor=#fefefe
| 420788 ||  || — || May 3, 1997 || Kitt Peak || Spacewatch || — || align=right data-sort-value="0.71" | 710 m || 
|-id=789 bgcolor=#fefefe
| 420789 ||  || — || October 10, 2004 || Kitt Peak || Spacewatch || — || align=right data-sort-value="0.72" | 720 m || 
|-id=790 bgcolor=#fefefe
| 420790 ||  || — || September 5, 2010 || Mount Lemmon || Mount Lemmon Survey || — || align=right data-sort-value="0.83" | 830 m || 
|-id=791 bgcolor=#E9E9E9
| 420791 ||  || — || November 11, 2006 || Kitt Peak || Spacewatch || EUN || align=right | 1.3 km || 
|-id=792 bgcolor=#fefefe
| 420792 ||  || — || April 20, 2010 || Kitt Peak || Spacewatch || — || align=right data-sort-value="0.54" | 540 m || 
|-id=793 bgcolor=#E9E9E9
| 420793 ||  || — || December 17, 2006 || Mount Lemmon || Mount Lemmon Survey || — || align=right | 1.4 km || 
|-id=794 bgcolor=#E9E9E9
| 420794 ||  || — || July 18, 2009 || Siding Spring || SSS || — || align=right | 1.8 km || 
|-id=795 bgcolor=#fefefe
| 420795 ||  || — || April 25, 2006 || Mount Lemmon || Mount Lemmon Survey || — || align=right | 1.1 km || 
|-id=796 bgcolor=#fefefe
| 420796 ||  || — || March 1, 2009 || Kitt Peak || Spacewatch || — || align=right data-sort-value="0.83" | 830 m || 
|-id=797 bgcolor=#fefefe
| 420797 ||  || — || September 14, 2007 || Mount Lemmon || Mount Lemmon Survey || — || align=right data-sort-value="0.72" | 720 m || 
|-id=798 bgcolor=#fefefe
| 420798 ||  || — || May 2, 2006 || Mount Lemmon || Mount Lemmon Survey || — || align=right data-sort-value="0.79" | 790 m || 
|-id=799 bgcolor=#fefefe
| 420799 ||  || — || April 18, 2013 || Kitt Peak || Spacewatch || — || align=right data-sort-value="0.81" | 810 m || 
|-id=800 bgcolor=#E9E9E9
| 420800 ||  || — || January 17, 2008 || Mount Lemmon || Mount Lemmon Survey || — || align=right | 2.6 km || 
|}

420801–420900 

|-bgcolor=#fefefe
| 420801 ||  || — || April 20, 2013 || Mount Lemmon || Mount Lemmon Survey || H || align=right data-sort-value="0.93" | 930 m || 
|-id=802 bgcolor=#fefefe
| 420802 ||  || — || December 11, 2006 || Socorro || LINEAR || H || align=right data-sort-value="0.70" | 700 m || 
|-id=803 bgcolor=#E9E9E9
| 420803 ||  || — || April 17, 2009 || Mount Lemmon || Mount Lemmon Survey || MAR || align=right data-sort-value="0.92" | 920 m || 
|-id=804 bgcolor=#fefefe
| 420804 ||  || — || September 26, 2003 || Apache Point || SDSS || — || align=right data-sort-value="0.96" | 960 m || 
|-id=805 bgcolor=#fefefe
| 420805 ||  || — || May 28, 2008 || Siding Spring || SSS || H || align=right data-sort-value="0.97" | 970 m || 
|-id=806 bgcolor=#fefefe
| 420806 ||  || — || September 26, 2011 || Kitt Peak || Spacewatch || H || align=right data-sort-value="0.71" | 710 m || 
|-id=807 bgcolor=#fefefe
| 420807 ||  || — || March 19, 2009 || Mount Lemmon || Mount Lemmon Survey || — || align=right data-sort-value="0.77" | 770 m || 
|-id=808 bgcolor=#fefefe
| 420808 ||  || — || October 14, 2001 || Kitt Peak || Spacewatch || — || align=right data-sort-value="0.85" | 850 m || 
|-id=809 bgcolor=#fefefe
| 420809 ||  || — || December 21, 2006 || Catalina || CSS || H || align=right data-sort-value="0.50" | 500 m || 
|-id=810 bgcolor=#fefefe
| 420810 ||  || — || October 1, 2003 || Kitt Peak || Spacewatch || — || align=right data-sort-value="0.58" | 580 m || 
|-id=811 bgcolor=#fefefe
| 420811 ||  || — || September 19, 2003 || Kitt Peak || Spacewatch || — || align=right data-sort-value="0.78" | 780 m || 
|-id=812 bgcolor=#E9E9E9
| 420812 ||  || — || October 17, 2006 || Mount Lemmon || Mount Lemmon Survey || — || align=right | 2.2 km || 
|-id=813 bgcolor=#fefefe
| 420813 ||  || — || October 21, 2007 || Mount Lemmon || Mount Lemmon Survey || — || align=right data-sort-value="0.90" | 900 m || 
|-id=814 bgcolor=#fefefe
| 420814 ||  || — || April 20, 2002 || Kitt Peak || Spacewatch || — || align=right data-sort-value="0.80" | 800 m || 
|-id=815 bgcolor=#E9E9E9
| 420815 ||  || — || December 21, 2006 || Cerro Tololo-DECam || CSS || — || align=right | 3.9 km || 
|-id=816 bgcolor=#d6d6d6
| 420816 ||  || — || September 13, 2004 || Kitt Peak || Spacewatch || — || align=right | 1.8 km || 
|-id=817 bgcolor=#fefefe
| 420817 ||  || — || September 11, 2007 || Catalina || CSS || — || align=right data-sort-value="0.68" | 680 m || 
|-id=818 bgcolor=#fefefe
| 420818 ||  || — || October 22, 2003 || Kitt Peak || Spacewatch || — || align=right data-sort-value="0.70" | 700 m || 
|-id=819 bgcolor=#fefefe
| 420819 ||  || — || May 20, 2010 || WISE || WISE || — || align=right | 2.1 km || 
|-id=820 bgcolor=#fefefe
| 420820 ||  || — || September 24, 1960 || Palomar || PLS || — || align=right data-sort-value="0.81" | 810 m || 
|-id=821 bgcolor=#fefefe
| 420821 ||  || — || April 28, 2003 || Cerro Tololo-DECam || Spacewatch || — || align=right data-sort-value="0.75" | 750 m || 
|-id=822 bgcolor=#fefefe
| 420822 ||  || — || October 18, 2003 || Kitt Peak || Spacewatch || — || align=right data-sort-value="0.43" | 430 m || 
|-id=823 bgcolor=#fefefe
| 420823 ||  || — || October 21, 1995 || Kitt Peak || Spacewatch || Hcritical || align=right data-sort-value="0.47" | 470 m || 
|-id=824 bgcolor=#fefefe
| 420824 ||  || — || October 19, 2003 || Apache Point || SDSS || — || align=right data-sort-value="0.60" | 600 m || 
|-id=825 bgcolor=#fefefe
| 420825 ||  || — || May 7, 2002 || Kitt Peak || Spacewatch || — || align=right data-sort-value="0.77" | 770 m || 
|-id=826 bgcolor=#d6d6d6
| 420826 ||  || — || October 5, 2003 || Kitt Peak || Spacewatch || Tj (2.99) || align=right | 2.6 km || 
|-id=827 bgcolor=#fefefe
| 420827 ||  || — || November 4, 2004 || Kitt Peak || Spacewatch || — || align=right data-sort-value="0.76" | 760 m || 
|-id=828 bgcolor=#fefefe
| 420828 ||  || — || January 29, 2004 || Socorro || LINEAR || — || align=right data-sort-value="0.92" | 920 m || 
|-id=829 bgcolor=#fefefe
| 420829 ||  || — || May 27, 2003 || Kitt Peak || Spacewatch || H || align=right data-sort-value="0.65" | 650 m || 
|-id=830 bgcolor=#fefefe
| 420830 ||  || — || January 16, 2009 || Kitt Peak || Spacewatch || V || align=right data-sort-value="0.81" | 810 m || 
|-id=831 bgcolor=#fefefe
| 420831 ||  || — || January 31, 2009 || Mount Lemmon || Mount Lemmon Survey || — || align=right data-sort-value="0.83" | 830 m || 
|-id=832 bgcolor=#fefefe
| 420832 ||  || — || February 2, 2009 || Kitt Peak || Spacewatch || — || align=right data-sort-value="0.72" | 720 m || 
|-id=833 bgcolor=#fefefe
| 420833 ||  || — || September 18, 2007 || Kitt Peak || Spacewatch || — || align=right data-sort-value="0.72" | 720 m || 
|-id=834 bgcolor=#fefefe
| 420834 ||  || — || July 7, 2010 || WISE || WISE || — || align=right | 1.9 km || 
|-id=835 bgcolor=#fefefe
| 420835 ||  || — || October 16, 2007 || Kitt Peak || Spacewatch || — || align=right data-sort-value="0.63" | 630 m || 
|-id=836 bgcolor=#fefefe
| 420836 ||  || — || December 5, 2007 || Mount Lemmon || Mount Lemmon Survey || — || align=right | 1.8 km || 
|-id=837 bgcolor=#E9E9E9
| 420837 ||  || — || October 12, 2010 || Mount Lemmon || Mount Lemmon Survey || PAD || align=right | 1.3 km || 
|-id=838 bgcolor=#fefefe
| 420838 ||  || — || February 5, 2009 || Kitt Peak || Spacewatch || — || align=right data-sort-value="0.68" | 680 m || 
|-id=839 bgcolor=#fefefe
| 420839 ||  || — || March 28, 2009 || Mount Lemmon || Mount Lemmon Survey || — || align=right | 2.6 km || 
|-id=840 bgcolor=#fefefe
| 420840 ||  || — || May 14, 2005 || Kitt Peak || Spacewatch || H || align=right data-sort-value="0.66" | 660 m || 
|-id=841 bgcolor=#fefefe
| 420841 ||  || — || May 3, 2006 || Mount Lemmon || Mount Lemmon Survey || — || align=right data-sort-value="0.71" | 710 m || 
|-id=842 bgcolor=#fefefe
| 420842 ||  || — || March 3, 2009 || Mount Lemmon || Mount Lemmon Survey || NYS || align=right data-sort-value="0.70" | 700 m || 
|-id=843 bgcolor=#fefefe
| 420843 ||  || — || April 25, 2006 || Catalina || CSS || — || align=right data-sort-value="0.91" | 910 m || 
|-id=844 bgcolor=#E9E9E9
| 420844 ||  || — || May 11, 2013 || Siding Spring || SSS || — || align=right | 1.6 km || 
|-id=845 bgcolor=#E9E9E9
| 420845 ||  || — || August 13, 2009 || Siding Spring || SSS || — || align=right | 4.0 km || 
|-id=846 bgcolor=#E9E9E9
| 420846 ||  || — || September 28, 2001 || Palomar || NEAT || — || align=right | 1.9 km || 
|-id=847 bgcolor=#fefefe
| 420847 ||  || — || March 2, 2006 || Kitt Peak || M. W. Buie || — || align=right data-sort-value="0.71" | 710 m || 
|-id=848 bgcolor=#fefefe
| 420848 ||  || — || October 12, 2007 || Mount Lemmon || Mount Lemmon Survey || — || align=right | 1.2 km || 
|-id=849 bgcolor=#fefefe
| 420849 ||  || — || May 24, 2006 || Mount Lemmon || Mount Lemmon Survey || MAS || align=right data-sort-value="0.81" | 810 m || 
|-id=850 bgcolor=#E9E9E9
| 420850 ||  || — || November 17, 2006 || Mount Lemmon || Mount Lemmon Survey || — || align=right | 1.0 km || 
|-id=851 bgcolor=#E9E9E9
| 420851 ||  || — || November 6, 2010 || Mount Lemmon || Mount Lemmon Survey || — || align=right | 1.5 km || 
|-id=852 bgcolor=#fefefe
| 420852 ||  || — || July 8, 2010 || Kitt Peak || Spacewatch || (2076) || align=right data-sort-value="0.84" | 840 m || 
|-id=853 bgcolor=#fefefe
| 420853 ||  || — || May 25, 2007 || Mount Lemmon || Mount Lemmon Survey || — || align=right data-sort-value="0.65" | 650 m || 
|-id=854 bgcolor=#fefefe
| 420854 ||  || — || May 6, 2006 || Mount Lemmon || Mount Lemmon Survey || V || align=right data-sort-value="0.55" | 550 m || 
|-id=855 bgcolor=#fefefe
| 420855 ||  || — || March 22, 2009 || Mount Lemmon || Mount Lemmon Survey || — || align=right data-sort-value="0.79" | 790 m || 
|-id=856 bgcolor=#fefefe
| 420856 ||  || — || March 2, 2009 || Mount Lemmon || Mount Lemmon Survey || — || align=right | 1.9 km || 
|-id=857 bgcolor=#fefefe
| 420857 ||  || — || November 14, 2006 || Mount Lemmon || Mount Lemmon Survey || H || align=right data-sort-value="0.86" | 860 m || 
|-id=858 bgcolor=#d6d6d6
| 420858 ||  || — || January 27, 2011 || Kitt Peak || Spacewatch || — || align=right | 3.4 km || 
|-id=859 bgcolor=#fefefe
| 420859 ||  || — || October 9, 2010 || Mount Lemmon || Mount Lemmon Survey || — || align=right | 1.0 km || 
|-id=860 bgcolor=#fefefe
| 420860 ||  || — || September 11, 2010 || Mount Lemmon || Mount Lemmon Survey || — || align=right data-sort-value="0.85" | 850 m || 
|-id=861 bgcolor=#fefefe
| 420861 ||  || — || November 7, 2007 || Kitt Peak || Spacewatch || — || align=right data-sort-value="0.79" | 790 m || 
|-id=862 bgcolor=#fefefe
| 420862 ||  || — || April 24, 1993 || Kitt Peak || Spacewatch || — || align=right data-sort-value="0.87" | 870 m || 
|-id=863 bgcolor=#fefefe
| 420863 ||  || — || February 6, 2002 || Socorro || LINEAR || H || align=right data-sort-value="0.81" | 810 m || 
|-id=864 bgcolor=#fefefe
| 420864 ||  || — || March 26, 2006 || Kitt Peak || Spacewatch || — || align=right data-sort-value="0.71" | 710 m || 
|-id=865 bgcolor=#fefefe
| 420865 ||  || — || March 24, 2006 || Mount Lemmon || Mount Lemmon Survey || (2076) || align=right data-sort-value="0.89" | 890 m || 
|-id=866 bgcolor=#E9E9E9
| 420866 ||  || — || November 16, 2006 || Kitt Peak || Spacewatch || — || align=right | 1.9 km || 
|-id=867 bgcolor=#E9E9E9
| 420867 ||  || — || September 28, 2006 || Mount Lemmon || Mount Lemmon Survey || EUN || align=right | 1.3 km || 
|-id=868 bgcolor=#fefefe
| 420868 ||  || — || December 18, 2003 || Socorro || LINEAR || H || align=right data-sort-value="0.82" | 820 m || 
|-id=869 bgcolor=#fefefe
| 420869 ||  || — || February 15, 2001 || Socorro || LINEAR || — || align=right | 1.0 km || 
|-id=870 bgcolor=#fefefe
| 420870 ||  || — || September 24, 2007 || Kitt Peak || Spacewatch || — || align=right | 1.3 km || 
|-id=871 bgcolor=#E9E9E9
| 420871 ||  || — || October 29, 2005 || Catalina || CSS || — || align=right | 1.6 km || 
|-id=872 bgcolor=#fefefe
| 420872 ||  || — || April 8, 2006 || Kitt Peak || Spacewatch || — || align=right data-sort-value="0.88" | 880 m || 
|-id=873 bgcolor=#d6d6d6
| 420873 ||  || — || November 7, 2010 || Mount Lemmon || Mount Lemmon Survey || — || align=right | 2.6 km || 
|-id=874 bgcolor=#fefefe
| 420874 ||  || — || April 22, 2002 || Kitt Peak || Spacewatch || — || align=right | 1.1 km || 
|-id=875 bgcolor=#fefefe
| 420875 ||  || — || November 5, 2007 || Kitt Peak || Spacewatch || — || align=right data-sort-value="0.85" | 850 m || 
|-id=876 bgcolor=#d6d6d6
| 420876 ||  || — || May 16, 2013 || Mount Lemmon || Mount Lemmon Survey || — || align=right | 2.8 km || 
|-id=877 bgcolor=#fefefe
| 420877 ||  || — || August 13, 2010 || Siding Spring || SSS || — || align=right data-sort-value="0.85" | 850 m || 
|-id=878 bgcolor=#fefefe
| 420878 ||  || — || September 7, 1999 || Socorro || LINEAR || — || align=right data-sort-value="0.90" | 900 m || 
|-id=879 bgcolor=#fefefe
| 420879 ||  || — || May 17, 1999 || Kitt Peak || Spacewatch || H || align=right data-sort-value="0.78" | 780 m || 
|-id=880 bgcolor=#E9E9E9
| 420880 ||  || — || October 25, 2005 || Kitt Peak || Spacewatch || — || align=right | 2.0 km || 
|-id=881 bgcolor=#d6d6d6
| 420881 ||  || — || May 3, 2008 || Mount Lemmon || Mount Lemmon Survey || — || align=right | 2.0 km || 
|-id=882 bgcolor=#E9E9E9
| 420882 ||  || — || December 21, 2006 || Kitt Peak || Spacewatch || — || align=right | 1.3 km || 
|-id=883 bgcolor=#fefefe
| 420883 ||  || — || October 8, 2004 || Kitt Peak || Spacewatch || — || align=right data-sort-value="0.67" | 670 m || 
|-id=884 bgcolor=#E9E9E9
| 420884 ||  || — || November 6, 2010 || Mount Lemmon || Mount Lemmon Survey || ADE || align=right | 1.8 km || 
|-id=885 bgcolor=#fefefe
| 420885 ||  || — || August 29, 2006 || Catalina || CSS || — || align=right data-sort-value="0.85" | 850 m || 
|-id=886 bgcolor=#d6d6d6
| 420886 ||  || — || September 14, 2004 || Socorro || LINEAR || — || align=right | 2.5 km || 
|-id=887 bgcolor=#E9E9E9
| 420887 ||  || — || December 8, 2010 || Catalina || CSS || — || align=right | 1.1 km || 
|-id=888 bgcolor=#fefefe
| 420888 ||  || — || October 4, 2002 || Palomar || NEAT || — || align=right | 1.1 km || 
|-id=889 bgcolor=#fefefe
| 420889 ||  || — || September 27, 2006 || Mount Lemmon || Mount Lemmon Survey || — || align=right data-sort-value="0.81" | 810 m || 
|-id=890 bgcolor=#fefefe
| 420890 ||  || — || March 1, 2009 || Mount Lemmon || Mount Lemmon Survey || V || align=right data-sort-value="0.67" | 670 m || 
|-id=891 bgcolor=#E9E9E9
| 420891 ||  || — || November 23, 2006 || Kitt Peak || Spacewatch || RAF || align=right data-sort-value="0.97" | 970 m || 
|-id=892 bgcolor=#fefefe
| 420892 ||  || — || May 7, 2013 || Kitt Peak || Spacewatch || — || align=right data-sort-value="0.91" | 910 m || 
|-id=893 bgcolor=#d6d6d6
| 420893 ||  || — || October 23, 2009 || Mount Lemmon || Mount Lemmon Survey || — || align=right | 2.6 km || 
|-id=894 bgcolor=#fefefe
| 420894 ||  || — || September 26, 2003 || Apache Point || SDSS || — || align=right data-sort-value="0.76" | 760 m || 
|-id=895 bgcolor=#E9E9E9
| 420895 ||  || — || January 29, 2012 || Kitt Peak || Spacewatch || — || align=right | 2.2 km || 
|-id=896 bgcolor=#fefefe
| 420896 ||  || — || July 12, 2005 || Mount Lemmon || Mount Lemmon Survey || H || align=right data-sort-value="0.91" | 910 m || 
|-id=897 bgcolor=#fefefe
| 420897 ||  || — || September 17, 2006 || Kitt Peak || Spacewatch || — || align=right data-sort-value="0.80" | 800 m || 
|-id=898 bgcolor=#fefefe
| 420898 ||  || — || April 19, 2009 || Kitt Peak || Spacewatch || — || align=right data-sort-value="0.89" | 890 m || 
|-id=899 bgcolor=#fefefe
| 420899 ||  || — || September 10, 2004 || Socorro || LINEAR || — || align=right data-sort-value="0.78" | 780 m || 
|-id=900 bgcolor=#d6d6d6
| 420900 ||  || — || December 3, 2008 || Catalina || CSS || — || align=right | 3.4 km || 
|}

420901–421000 

|-bgcolor=#fefefe
| 420901 ||  || — || September 2, 2010 || Mount Lemmon || Mount Lemmon Survey || — || align=right data-sort-value="0.81" | 810 m || 
|-id=902 bgcolor=#fefefe
| 420902 ||  || — || March 19, 2009 || Catalina || CSS || — || align=right | 1.1 km || 
|-id=903 bgcolor=#E9E9E9
| 420903 ||  || — || September 24, 2000 || Anderson Mesa || LONEOS || — || align=right | 2.3 km || 
|-id=904 bgcolor=#d6d6d6
| 420904 ||  || — || April 11, 2007 || Catalina || CSS || — || align=right | 3.4 km || 
|-id=905 bgcolor=#fefefe
| 420905 ||  || — || October 15, 2007 || Mount Lemmon || Mount Lemmon Survey || — || align=right data-sort-value="0.77" | 770 m || 
|-id=906 bgcolor=#fefefe
| 420906 ||  || — || December 15, 2001 || Socorro || LINEAR || — || align=right data-sort-value="0.90" | 900 m || 
|-id=907 bgcolor=#d6d6d6
| 420907 ||  || — || June 1, 2008 || Mount Lemmon || Mount Lemmon Survey || BRA || align=right | 1.7 km || 
|-id=908 bgcolor=#E9E9E9
| 420908 ||  || — || September 11, 2004 || Socorro || LINEAR || — || align=right | 3.4 km || 
|-id=909 bgcolor=#fefefe
| 420909 ||  || — || October 15, 2007 || Kitt Peak || Spacewatch || — || align=right data-sort-value="0.82" | 820 m || 
|-id=910 bgcolor=#E9E9E9
| 420910 ||  || — || July 4, 1995 || Kitt Peak || Spacewatch || — || align=right | 2.3 km || 
|-id=911 bgcolor=#d6d6d6
| 420911 ||  || — || June 19, 2013 || Mount Lemmon || Mount Lemmon Survey || — || align=right | 3.1 km || 
|-id=912 bgcolor=#d6d6d6
| 420912 ||  || — || March 1, 2012 || Mount Lemmon || Mount Lemmon Survey || — || align=right | 2.1 km || 
|-id=913 bgcolor=#d6d6d6
| 420913 ||  || — || June 19, 2013 || Mount Lemmon || Mount Lemmon Survey || — || align=right | 3.5 km || 
|-id=914 bgcolor=#fefefe
| 420914 ||  || — || March 25, 2010 || WISE || WISE || — || align=right | 3.7 km || 
|-id=915 bgcolor=#fefefe
| 420915 ||  || — || February 16, 2010 || Siding Spring || SSS || H || align=right data-sort-value="0.81" | 810 m || 
|-id=916 bgcolor=#d6d6d6
| 420916 ||  || — || September 30, 2003 || Kitt Peak || Spacewatch || — || align=right | 2.5 km || 
|-id=917 bgcolor=#d6d6d6
| 420917 ||  || — || October 10, 2008 || Mount Lemmon || Mount Lemmon Survey || — || align=right | 3.7 km || 
|-id=918 bgcolor=#E9E9E9
| 420918 ||  || — || September 25, 2005 || Kitt Peak || Spacewatch || — || align=right | 1.4 km || 
|-id=919 bgcolor=#d6d6d6
| 420919 ||  || — || September 30, 1973 || Palomar || PLS || KOR || align=right | 1.9 km || 
|-id=920 bgcolor=#d6d6d6
| 420920 ||  || — || January 12, 2011 || Mount Lemmon || Mount Lemmon Survey || EOS || align=right | 1.8 km || 
|-id=921 bgcolor=#fefefe
| 420921 ||  || — || September 21, 2003 || Kitt Peak || Spacewatch || — || align=right data-sort-value="0.79" | 790 m || 
|-id=922 bgcolor=#d6d6d6
| 420922 ||  || — || September 22, 2008 || Catalina || CSS || — || align=right | 6.0 km || 
|-id=923 bgcolor=#E9E9E9
| 420923 ||  || — || September 7, 2004 || Kitt Peak || Spacewatch || — || align=right | 1.9 km || 
|-id=924 bgcolor=#fefefe
| 420924 ||  || — || August 17, 2006 || Palomar || NEAT || NYS || align=right data-sort-value="0.60" | 600 m || 
|-id=925 bgcolor=#E9E9E9
| 420925 ||  || — || March 9, 2008 || Mount Lemmon || Mount Lemmon Survey || — || align=right data-sort-value="0.71" | 710 m || 
|-id=926 bgcolor=#d6d6d6
| 420926 ||  || — || January 11, 1999 || Kitt Peak || Spacewatch || VER || align=right | 3.1 km || 
|-id=927 bgcolor=#E9E9E9
| 420927 ||  || — || January 27, 2007 || Mount Lemmon || Mount Lemmon Survey || — || align=right | 1.8 km || 
|-id=928 bgcolor=#E9E9E9
| 420928 ||  || — || January 14, 2011 || Kitt Peak || Spacewatch || — || align=right | 1.9 km || 
|-id=929 bgcolor=#E9E9E9
| 420929 ||  || — || March 26, 2008 || Mount Lemmon || Mount Lemmon Survey || — || align=right data-sort-value="0.77" | 770 m || 
|-id=930 bgcolor=#d6d6d6
| 420930 ||  || — || August 3, 2002 || Palomar || NEAT || — || align=right | 3.9 km || 
|-id=931 bgcolor=#d6d6d6
| 420931 ||  || — || August 10, 2007 || Kitt Peak || Spacewatch || — || align=right | 3.7 km || 
|-id=932 bgcolor=#d6d6d6
| 420932 ||  || — || June 20, 2007 || Kitt Peak || Spacewatch || — || align=right | 3.3 km || 
|-id=933 bgcolor=#E9E9E9
| 420933 ||  || — || January 10, 2011 || Catalina || CSS || — || align=right | 1.5 km || 
|-id=934 bgcolor=#E9E9E9
| 420934 ||  || — || October 30, 2005 || Kitt Peak || Spacewatch || — || align=right | 1.8 km || 
|-id=935 bgcolor=#E9E9E9
| 420935 ||  || — || August 25, 2000 || Kitt Peak || Spacewatch || — || align=right | 2.0 km || 
|-id=936 bgcolor=#d6d6d6
| 420936 ||  || — || July 16, 2002 || Palomar || NEAT || — || align=right | 3.7 km || 
|-id=937 bgcolor=#d6d6d6
| 420937 ||  || — || February 4, 2010 || WISE || WISE || — || align=right | 5.2 km || 
|-id=938 bgcolor=#d6d6d6
| 420938 ||  || — || October 17, 2003 || Kitt Peak || Spacewatch || EMA || align=right | 3.0 km || 
|-id=939 bgcolor=#fefefe
| 420939 ||  || — || April 14, 2005 || Kitt Peak || Spacewatch || CLA || align=right | 1.8 km || 
|-id=940 bgcolor=#d6d6d6
| 420940 ||  || — || March 10, 2010 || WISE || WISE || — || align=right | 4.2 km || 
|-id=941 bgcolor=#E9E9E9
| 420941 ||  || — || September 11, 2004 || Socorro || LINEAR || — || align=right | 3.4 km || 
|-id=942 bgcolor=#d6d6d6
| 420942 ||  || — || December 2, 2004 || Kitt Peak || Spacewatch || — || align=right | 5.3 km || 
|-id=943 bgcolor=#fefefe
| 420943 ||  || — || November 16, 2006 || Kitt Peak || Spacewatch || — || align=right data-sort-value="0.94" | 940 m || 
|-id=944 bgcolor=#d6d6d6
| 420944 ||  || — || March 30, 2000 || Kitt Peak || Spacewatch || EOS || align=right | 2.1 km || 
|-id=945 bgcolor=#d6d6d6
| 420945 ||  || — || August 22, 2007 || Anderson Mesa || LONEOS || — || align=right | 4.0 km || 
|-id=946 bgcolor=#E9E9E9
| 420946 ||  || — || September 15, 2009 || Kitt Peak || Spacewatch || — || align=right | 2.1 km || 
|-id=947 bgcolor=#d6d6d6
| 420947 ||  || — || September 21, 2008 || Mount Lemmon || Mount Lemmon Survey || — || align=right | 4.0 km || 
|-id=948 bgcolor=#E9E9E9
| 420948 ||  || — || December 14, 2010 || Mount Lemmon || Mount Lemmon Survey || EUN || align=right | 1.3 km || 
|-id=949 bgcolor=#d6d6d6
| 420949 ||  || — || November 9, 2009 || Mount Lemmon || Mount Lemmon Survey || — || align=right | 2.0 km || 
|-id=950 bgcolor=#d6d6d6
| 420950 ||  || — || October 8, 2008 || Mount Lemmon || Mount Lemmon Survey || VER || align=right | 2.2 km || 
|-id=951 bgcolor=#d6d6d6
| 420951 ||  || — || September 29, 2003 || Kitt Peak || Spacewatch || EOS || align=right | 1.6 km || 
|-id=952 bgcolor=#fefefe
| 420952 ||  || — || April 10, 2005 || Kitt Peak || Spacewatch || V || align=right data-sort-value="0.79" | 790 m || 
|-id=953 bgcolor=#fefefe
| 420953 ||  || — || November 19, 2001 || Socorro || LINEAR || — || align=right data-sort-value="0.80" | 800 m || 
|-id=954 bgcolor=#d6d6d6
| 420954 ||  || — || May 28, 2008 || Mount Lemmon || Mount Lemmon Survey || — || align=right | 3.4 km || 
|-id=955 bgcolor=#E9E9E9
| 420955 ||  || — || April 21, 2012 || Catalina || CSS || — || align=right | 1.5 km || 
|-id=956 bgcolor=#fefefe
| 420956 ||  || — || October 22, 2003 || Apache Point || SDSS || — || align=right data-sort-value="0.93" | 930 m || 
|-id=957 bgcolor=#d6d6d6
| 420957 ||  || — || September 5, 2008 || Kitt Peak || Spacewatch || — || align=right | 3.1 km || 
|-id=958 bgcolor=#d6d6d6
| 420958 ||  || — || December 19, 2009 || Mount Lemmon || Mount Lemmon Survey || — || align=right | 2.9 km || 
|-id=959 bgcolor=#fefefe
| 420959 ||  || — || February 10, 2008 || Mount Lemmon || Mount Lemmon Survey || — || align=right | 1.1 km || 
|-id=960 bgcolor=#d6d6d6
| 420960 ||  || — || February 19, 2010 || WISE || WISE || — || align=right | 5.5 km || 
|-id=961 bgcolor=#fefefe
| 420961 ||  || — || March 3, 2008 || Mount Lemmon || Mount Lemmon Survey || — || align=right data-sort-value="0.85" | 850 m || 
|-id=962 bgcolor=#d6d6d6
| 420962 ||  || — || November 19, 2009 || Kitt Peak || Spacewatch || — || align=right | 3.2 km || 
|-id=963 bgcolor=#fefefe
| 420963 ||  || — || February 6, 2008 || Catalina || CSS || — || align=right | 1.3 km || 
|-id=964 bgcolor=#fefefe
| 420964 ||  || — || November 18, 2007 || Mount Lemmon || Mount Lemmon Survey || V || align=right data-sort-value="0.75" | 750 m || 
|-id=965 bgcolor=#d6d6d6
| 420965 ||  || — || October 3, 2006 || Kitt Peak || Spacewatch || SHU3:2 || align=right | 4.8 km || 
|-id=966 bgcolor=#d6d6d6
| 420966 ||  || — || March 14, 2007 || Mount Lemmon || Mount Lemmon Survey || — || align=right | 3.7 km || 
|-id=967 bgcolor=#fefefe
| 420967 ||  || — || November 8, 2007 || Mount Lemmon || Mount Lemmon Survey || — || align=right data-sort-value="0.83" | 830 m || 
|-id=968 bgcolor=#d6d6d6
| 420968 ||  || — || November 18, 2009 || Kitt Peak || Spacewatch || KOR || align=right | 1.2 km || 
|-id=969 bgcolor=#d6d6d6
| 420969 ||  || — || September 18, 2003 || Palomar || NEAT || — || align=right | 2.7 km || 
|-id=970 bgcolor=#E9E9E9
| 420970 ||  || — || December 31, 2005 || Kitt Peak || Spacewatch || GEF || align=right | 1.5 km || 
|-id=971 bgcolor=#d6d6d6
| 420971 ||  || — || January 16, 2005 || Kitt Peak || Spacewatch || — || align=right | 3.1 km || 
|-id=972 bgcolor=#E9E9E9
| 420972 ||  || — || August 9, 2004 || Anderson Mesa || LONEOS || — || align=right | 2.4 km || 
|-id=973 bgcolor=#d6d6d6
| 420973 ||  || — || April 16, 2010 || WISE || WISE || — || align=right | 4.7 km || 
|-id=974 bgcolor=#d6d6d6
| 420974 ||  || — || June 21, 2007 || Mount Lemmon || Mount Lemmon Survey || — || align=right | 2.8 km || 
|-id=975 bgcolor=#fefefe
| 420975 ||  || — || February 12, 2008 || Mount Lemmon || Mount Lemmon Survey || V || align=right data-sort-value="0.79" | 790 m || 
|-id=976 bgcolor=#d6d6d6
| 420976 ||  || — || January 16, 2011 || Mount Lemmon || Mount Lemmon Survey || — || align=right | 3.0 km || 
|-id=977 bgcolor=#E9E9E9
| 420977 ||  || — || August 25, 2004 || Kitt Peak || Spacewatch || — || align=right | 2.1 km || 
|-id=978 bgcolor=#E9E9E9
| 420978 ||  || — || January 10, 2006 || Kitt Peak || Spacewatch || — || align=right | 1.9 km || 
|-id=979 bgcolor=#E9E9E9
| 420979 ||  || — || September 16, 2004 || Kitt Peak || Spacewatch || — || align=right | 2.2 km || 
|-id=980 bgcolor=#d6d6d6
| 420980 ||  || — || September 10, 2002 || Palomar || NEAT || — || align=right | 3.5 km || 
|-id=981 bgcolor=#d6d6d6
| 420981 ||  || — || September 25, 2003 || Elena Remote || NEAT || — || align=right | 4.0 km || 
|-id=982 bgcolor=#d6d6d6
| 420982 ||  || — || September 29, 2008 || Mount Lemmon || Mount Lemmon Survey || — || align=right | 3.9 km || 
|-id=983 bgcolor=#d6d6d6
| 420983 ||  || — || October 19, 2006 || Mount Lemmon || Mount Lemmon Survey || 3:2 || align=right | 4.4 km || 
|-id=984 bgcolor=#d6d6d6
| 420984 ||  || — || October 27, 2008 || Kitt Peak || Spacewatch || — || align=right | 3.1 km || 
|-id=985 bgcolor=#d6d6d6
| 420985 ||  || — || February 14, 2010 || Mount Lemmon || Mount Lemmon Survey || — || align=right | 2.8 km || 
|-id=986 bgcolor=#E9E9E9
| 420986 ||  || — || March 25, 2004 || Siding Spring || SSS || — || align=right | 2.8 km || 
|-id=987 bgcolor=#E9E9E9
| 420987 ||  || — || November 26, 2005 || Kitt Peak || Spacewatch || — || align=right | 1.7 km || 
|-id=988 bgcolor=#d6d6d6
| 420988 ||  || — || May 3, 2006 || Kitt Peak || Spacewatch || — || align=right | 3.0 km || 
|-id=989 bgcolor=#E9E9E9
| 420989 ||  || — || January 6, 1998 || Xinglong || SCAP || — || align=right | 2.1 km || 
|-id=990 bgcolor=#d6d6d6
| 420990 ||  || — || March 25, 2007 || Mount Lemmon || Mount Lemmon Survey || — || align=right | 3.2 km || 
|-id=991 bgcolor=#d6d6d6
| 420991 ||  || — || September 19, 2003 || Kitt Peak || Spacewatch || — || align=right | 2.9 km || 
|-id=992 bgcolor=#E9E9E9
| 420992 ||  || — || September 19, 2009 || Kitt Peak || Spacewatch || — || align=right | 1.7 km || 
|-id=993 bgcolor=#d6d6d6
| 420993 ||  || — || May 20, 2006 || Kitt Peak || Spacewatch || — || align=right | 4.1 km || 
|-id=994 bgcolor=#E9E9E9
| 420994 ||  || — || March 9, 2007 || Kitt Peak || Spacewatch || — || align=right | 2.9 km || 
|-id=995 bgcolor=#d6d6d6
| 420995 ||  || — || March 6, 2011 || Kitt Peak || Spacewatch || — || align=right | 3.4 km || 
|-id=996 bgcolor=#d6d6d6
| 420996 ||  || — || February 16, 2004 || Kitt Peak || Spacewatch || — || align=right | 3.5 km || 
|-id=997 bgcolor=#E9E9E9
| 420997 ||  || — || December 21, 2006 || Kitt Peak || Spacewatch || EUN || align=right | 1.3 km || 
|-id=998 bgcolor=#E9E9E9
| 420998 ||  || — || December 3, 2010 || Kitt Peak || Spacewatch || — || align=right | 2.5 km || 
|-id=999 bgcolor=#E9E9E9
| 420999 ||  || — || August 29, 2005 || Kitt Peak || Spacewatch || MAR || align=right data-sort-value="0.91" | 910 m || 
|-id=000 bgcolor=#d6d6d6
| 421000 ||  || — || October 10, 2008 || Mount Lemmon || Mount Lemmon Survey || — || align=right | 2.8 km || 
|}

References

External links 
 Discovery Circumstances: Numbered Minor Planets (420001)–(425000) (IAU Minor Planet Center)

0420